This timeline of Christian missions chronicles the global expansion of Christianity through a listing of the most significant missionary outreach events.

Apostolic Age

Earliest dates must all be considered approximate
 33 – Great Commission of Jesus to go and make disciples of all nations; Pentecost, a day in which 3000 Jews from a variety of Mediterranean Basin nations are converted to faith in Jesus Christ.
 34 – In Gaza, Philip baptizes a convert, an Ethiopian who was already a Jewish proselyte.
 34 – Saul of Tarsus is converted, and becomes Paul.
 39 – Peter preaches to a Gentile audience in the house of Cornelius in Caesarea Maritima.
 42 – Mark goes to Alexandria in Egypt
 47 – Paul (formerly known as Saul of Tarsus) begins his first missionary journey to Western Anatolia, part of modern-day Turkey via Cyprus.
 50 – Council of Jerusalem on admitting Gentiles into the Church
 51 – Paul begins his second missionary journey, a trip that will take him through modern-day Turkey and on into Greece
 52 – Thomas arrives in Malabar and Coromandel Coast in India and founds church that subsequently becomes the Syrian Malabar Nasranis
 54 – Paul begins his third missionary journey
 60 – Paul sent to Rome under Roman guard, evangelizes on Malta after shipwreck

Early Christianity

 100 – First Christians are reported in Monaco, Algeria; a missionary goes to Arbela, a sacred city of the Assyrians that the Christian church is katholikos ("universal")
 112 – Pliny the Younger reports rapid growth of Christianity in Bithynia
 140 – Hermas writes:  "The Son of God ... has been preached to the ends of the earth"
 150 – Gospel reaches Portugal and Morocco
 166 – Bishop Soter writes that the number of Christians has surpassed the Jews
 174 – First Christians reported in Austria
 177 – Churches in Lyon and Vienne (southern France) report being persecuted
 190 – Pataenus of Alexandria goes to India in response to an appeal for Christian teachers
 196 – In Assuristan (Parthian ruled Assyria) Bar Daisan writes of Christians among the Assyrians, Parthians, Bactrians (Kushans), and other peoples in the Persian Empire
 197 – Tertullian writes that Christianity had penetrated all ranks of society in North Africa
 200 – First Christians are reported in Switzerland and Belgium
 206 – Abgar, the Syriac King of Edessa, embraces the Christian faith
 208 – Tertullian writes that Christ has followers on the far side of the Roman wall in Britain where Roman legions have not yet penetrated
 250 – Denis (or Denys or Dionysius) is sent from Rome along with six other missionaries to establish the church in Paris
 270 – Death of Gregory Thaumaturgus, Christian leader in Pontus. It was said that when Gregory became "bishop" there were only 17 Christians in Pontus while at his death thirty years later there were only 17 non-Christians.
 280 – First rural churches emerge in northern Italy; Christianity is no longer exclusively in urban areas
 287 – Maurice from Egypt is killed at Agauno, Switzerland for refusing to sacrifice to pagan divinities
 300 – First Christians reported in Greater Khorasan; an estimated 10% of the world's population is now Christian; parts of the Bible are available in 10 different languages

 304 – Armenia accepts Christianity as state religion
 306 – The first bishop of Nisibis is ordained
 311 - The Edict of Sedica, also called was issued in Serdica by the Roman emperor Galerius, officially ending the Diocletianic persecution of Christianity in the East.
 313 – Emperor Constantine issues Edict of Milan, legalizing Christianity in the Roman Empire
 314 – Tiridates III of Armenia and King Urnayr of Caucasian Albania converted by Gregory the Illuminator

Era of the seven Ecumenical Councils

 327 – Georgian King Mirian III of Iberia converted by Nino
 330 – Ethiopian King Ezana of Axum makes Christianity an official religion
 332 – Two young Roman Christians, Frumentius and Aedesius, are the sole survivors of a ship destroyed in the Red Sea due to tensions between Rome and Aksum. They are taken as slaves to the Ethiopian capital of Axum to serve in the royal court.
 334 – The first bishop is ordained for Merv / Transoxiana (area of modern-day Uzbekistan, Tajikistan, Turkmenistan and southwest Kazakhstan)
 337 – Emperor Constantine baptized shortly before his death
 341 – Ulfilas begins work with the Goths in present-day Romania
 343 - The Council of Serdica, or Synod of Serdica (also Sardica), was a synod convened in 343 at Serdica in the civil diocese of Dacia, by Roman dominate Emperors Constans I, augustus in the West, and Constantius II, augustus in the East. It attempted to resolve the Arian controversy, and was attended by about 170 bishops. It was convened by the two augusti at the request of Pope Julius I. 
 350 – Bible is translated into Saidic, an Egyptian language
 354 – Theophilus "the Indian" reports visiting Christians in India; Philostorgius mentions a community of Christians on the Socotra islands, south of Yemen in the Arabian Sea
 364 – Conversion of Vandals to Christianity begins during reign of Emperor Valens
 370 – Wulfila translates the Bible into Gothic, the first Bible translation done specifically for missionary purposes
 378 – Jerome writes, "From India to Britain, all nations resound with the death and resurrection of Christ"
 380 – Roman Emperor Theodosius I makes Christianity the official state religion
 382 – Jerome is commissioned to translate the Gospels (and subsequently the whole Bible) into Latin.
 386 – Augustine of Hippo converted
 397 – Ninian evangelizes the Southern Picts of Scotland; three missionaries sent to the mountaineers in the Trento region of northern Italy are martyred
 400 – Hayyan begins proclaiming gospel in Yemen after having been converted in Hirta on the Persian border; in starting a school for native Gothic evangelists, John Chrysostom writes, "'Go and make disciples of all nations' was not said for the Apostles onlyu, but for us also"

 410 – New Testament translated into Armenian
 420 – A Pre-Islam Arabian Bedouin tribe under sheikh Peter-Aspebet is converted 
 425 – The first bishops are ordained for Herat (Afghanistan) and Samarkand (Uzbekistan)
 432 – Patrick goes to Ireland as missionary
 450 – First Christians reported in Liechtenstein
 496 – Conversion of Clovis I, king of Franks in Gaul, along with 3,000 warriors
 499 – Persian king Kavadh I, fleeing his country, meets a group of Christian missionaries going to Central Asia to preach to the Turks
 500 – First Christians reported in North Yemen; Nairam becomes Christian center

 508 – Philoxenus of Mabug begins translation of the Bible into Syriac
 529 – Benedict of Nursia destroys pagan temple at Monte Cassino (Italy and builds a monastery
 535 – The Hephthalite Huns – nomads living in northern China and Central Asia, who were also known as the White Huns – are taught to read and write by Church of the East missionaries.
 542 – Julian (or Julianus) from Constantinople begins evangelizing Nubia, accompanied by an Egyptian named Theodore
 563 – Columba sails from Ireland to Scotland where he founds an evangelistic training center on Iona
 569 – Longinus, church leader in Nobatia, evangelizes Alodia (in what is now Sudan)
 578 – Conversion to Christianity of An-numan III, last of Lakhmids (Pre Islam Arab prince)
 585 – Irish missionary Columbanus arrives with twelve fellow missionaries in Brittany, France
 592 – Death of Celtic/Irish missionary Moluag (Old Irish: Mo-Luóc)
 596 – Gregory the Great sends Augustine and a team of missionaries to (what is now) England to reintroduce the Gospel. The missionaries settle in Canterbury and within a year baptize 10,000 people
 600 – First Christian settlers in Andorra (between France and Spain)

 604 – A church is reportedly planted on Thorney Island (where Westminster Abbey now stands)
 610 – Saint Columbanus and Saint Gall flee from Luxeuil (France) to Alemannia and preach the Gospel in Tuggen and Bregenz
 627 – Conversion of King Edwin of Northumbria
 629 – Amandus of Elnon is consecrated a missionary bishop. He evangelized the region around Ghent and went on missions to Slavs along the Danube and to Basques in Navarre
 630 – Conversion of the East Angles (one of the seven kingdoms of the Anglo-Saxon Heptarchy)
 635 –  First Christian missionaries (Church of the East monks, including Alopen, from Asia Minor and Persia arrive in China; Aidan of Lindisfarne begins evangelizing in the heart of Northumbria (England)
 637 – Lombards, a German people living in northern Italy, become Christians
 638 – A church building is erected in Ch'ang-an, then perhaps the largest city in the world (see Daqin Pagoda)
 647 – Amadeus, bishop of Maastricht, carries out missionary work in Frisia (Netherlands) and among the Slavs
 650 – First church organized in Netherlands
 673 – Irish monk Maol Rubha founds a training center at Aprochrosan that would serve as a base for missionary outreach into Scotland
 680 – First translation of Christian scriptures into Arabic
 687 – Conversion of Sussex
 689 – Pagans kill Irish missionary Kilian near Würzburg in what is now Germany.
 692 – Willibrord and 11 companions cross the North Sea to become missionaries to the Frisians (modern-day Netherlands)
 697 – Muslims overrun Carthage, capital of North Africa

 720 – Caliph Umar II puts heavy pressure on the Christian Berbers to convert to Islam
 716 – Boniface begins missionary work among Germanic tribes
 724 – Boniface fells pagan sacred oak of Thor at Geismar in Hesse (Germany)
 732 – Muslim advance from Spain and southern France stopped by Charles Martell at Tours and Poitiers
 740 – Irish monks reach Iceland
 771 – Charlemagne becomes king and will decree that sermons be given in the vernacular. He also commissioned Bible translations.
 781 – Xi'an Stele erected near Xi'an (China) to commemorate the propagation in China of the Luminous Religion, thus providing a written record of a Christian presence in China
 787 – Liudger begins missionary work among the pagans near the mouth of the Ems river (in Germany)

Middle Ages

 822 – Mojmír I of Great Moravia, converts to Christianity
 826 – Ansgar from France is sent by papal authority to Denmark as a royal chaplain and missionary; Harald Klak is baptized along with 400 of his followers at Mainz
 828 – First Christian church in present-day Slovakia is built in Nitra; First missionaries reach the area that is now the Czech Republic
 830 – Scots-born Erluph is evangelizing in (what is now) Germany when he is killed by the Vandals
 859 – Execution of Eulogius, proponent of confrontational Christian witness in Spain and other Muslim-dominated societies. Opposed to any feeling of affinity with Muslim culture, Eulogius advocated using a missiology of martyrdom to confront Islam.
 863 – Cyril and Methodius are invited by Rastislav to evangelize in Great Moravia and the Balaton Principality
 864 – Conversion of Prince Boris of Bulgaria and Christianization of Bulgaria
 867 – All Serbian tribes are fully Christianized
 878 – Last definite reference to Christians in China before the Mongol era
 880 – First Slavic archbishopric established in Great Moravia with Methodius as its head; Bible translated into Slavonic
 900 – Missionaries from the archdiocese of Bremen-Hamburg reach Norway

 912 – The Normans become Christian
 948 – The leader of the Magyars converts to Christianity
 957 – Princess Olga of Kiev baptized
 965 – Harold I of Denmark converts to Christianity and smooths the way for the acceptance of Christian faith by the Danish people
 966 – Mieszko I of Poland converts to Christianity and begins the period of Christian Poland
 987 – Church of the East monks visiting China find no traces of Christian community left
 988 – Baptism of Kievan Rus' under Vladimir I
 995 – Christian missionaries from Norway begin working in Iceland
 997 – Adalbert of Prague dies as a martyr in Prussia

1000 to 1499 

 1000 – Christianity accepted by common consent in Iceland by parliament (Alþingi). Leif the Lucky introduces the Gospel to Greenland, possibly Vinland (Newfoundland)
 1003 – The Hungarian king sends evangelists to Transylvania
 1008 – Sigfrid (or Sigurd), English missionary, baptizes King Olof of Sweden
 1009 – Bruno of Querfurt is beheaded in Prussia where he had gone as a missionary
 1015 – Russia is said to have been "comprehensively" converted to the Orthodox faith; Olaf II Haroldsson becomes the first king of the whole of Norway. Over the next 15 years he would organize Norway's final conversion and its integration into Christian Europe.
 1017 – Günther tries to convert the inhabitants of Vorpommern; the mission is not successful.

 1122 – Bernhard, later bishop of Lebus launches an unsuccessful mission in the Duchy of Pomerania
 1124–28 – Otto von Bamberg succeeds in the Conversion of Pomerania Bishopric of Cammin established in Pomerania in 1140.
 1168 – Absalon subdues and converts the Principality of Rügen
 1200 – The Bible is now available in 22 different languages
 1210 – Franciscan Order established

 1216 – Dominican Order established
 1219 – Francis of Assisi presents the Gospel to the Sultan of Egypt
 1227 – Prince Bort converted and baptized in the Ukraine
 1244 – Christians are reported in Lithuania with King Mindaugas being baptized in 1251
 1253 – Franciscan William of Rubruck begins his journey to the Mongols
 1266 – Mongol leader Khan sends Marco Polo's father and uncle, Niccolo and Matteo Polo, back to Europe with a request to the Pope to send 100 Christian missionaries (only two responded and one died before reaching Mongol territory)
 1276 – Ramon Llull opens training center to send missionaries to North Africa
 1291 – Appointment of first indigenous bishop in Finland
 1294 – Franciscan Giovanni di Monte Corvino arrives in China

 1303 – Arnold of Cologne arrives in China to assist Giovanni di Monte Corvino
 1321 – Jordanus, a Dominican friar, arrives in India as the first resident Roman Catholic missionary
 1322 – Odoric of Pordenone, a Franciscan friar from Italy, arrives in China
 1323 – Franciscans make contacts on Sumatra, Java, and Borneo
 1326 – Chaghatayid Khan Ilchigedai grants permission for a church to be built in Samarkand, Uzbekistan
 1329 – Nicaea falls to Muslim Ottoman Turks
 1334 – Chaghatayid Khan Buzun allows Christians to rebuild churches and permits Franciscans to establish a missionary episcopate in Almaliq, Azerbaijan
 1368 – Collapse of the Franciscan mission in China as Ming Dynasty abolishes Christianity
 1379 – Stephen of Perm travels north toward the White Sea and settles as a missionary among the Uralic-speaking Komi peoples living between Pechora and Vychegda Rivers at Ust-Vim
 1382 – Bible translated into English from Latin by John Wycliff
 1386 – Jogaila (baptized – Wladyslaw II), king of the Lithuanians, is baptized
 1389 – Large numbers of Christians march through the streets of Cairo, denouncing Islam and lamenting that they had abandoned the religion of their fathers from fear of persecution. They were beheaded, both men and women, and a fresh persecution of Christians followed
 1400 – Scriptures translated into Icelandic

 1408 – Spanish Dominican Vincent Ferrer begins a ministry in Italy in which it is said that thousands of Jews and Muslims were won to faith in Christ
 1410 – Bible is translated into Hungarian
 1420 – Franciscan missionaries accompany Portuguese expedition to Madeira
 1431 – Franciscan missionaries accompany Portuguese expedition to the Azores
 1435 – Forced conversion of Jews in Palma de Mallorca, Spain
 1445 – First Christians reported in Guinea Bissau
 1448 – First Christians reported in Mauritania
 1450 – Franciscan missionaries accompany Portuguese expedition to the Cape Verde Islands
 1453 – Constantinople falls to the Muslim Ottoman Turks who make it their capital. An Islamic service of thanksgiving is held in the church of Saint Sophia
 1455 – With the bull Romanus Pontifex the patronage of missions in new countries behind Cape Bojador is given to the Portuguese (see "Padroado").
 1462 – Johannes Gutenberg begins printing the Bible with his movable-type printing process; Pope Pius II assigns the evangelization of the Portuguese Guinea Coast of Africa to the Franciscans led by Alfonso de Bolano
 1485 – After having come into contact with the Portuguese, the King of Benin requests that a church be planted in his kingdom
 1486 – Dominicans become active in West Africa, notably among the Wolof people in Senegambia.
 1489 – Baptism of Wolof king Behemoi in Senegal
 1491 – The Congo sees its first group of missionaries arrive. Under the ministry of these Franciscan and Dominican priests, the king would soon be baptized and a church built at the royal capital.
 1492 – Birth of the church in Angola
 1493 – Pope Alexander VI allows Spain to colonize the New World with Catholic missions; Christopher Columbus takes Christian priests with him on his second journey to the New World
 1494 – First missionaries arrive in Dominican Republic
 1495 – The head of a convent in Seville, Spain, Mercedarian Jorge, makes a trip to the West Indies.
 1496 – First Christian baptisms in the New World take place when Guaticaba along with other members of his household are baptized on the island of Hispaniola
 1497 – Forced conversion of Jews in Portugal
 1498 – First Christians are reported in Kenya
 1499 – Portuguese Augustinian missionaries arrive at Zanzibar. Their mission will end in 1698 due to the Oman-Arab conquest.

1500 to 1600 

 1500 – Franciscans enter Brazil with Cabral
 1501 – Portuguese explorer João da Nova builds a chapel at Mossel Bay, the first one in South Africa
 1501 – Pope Alexander VI grants to the crown of Spain all the newly discovered countries in the Americas, on condition that provision be made for the religious instruction of the native populations
 1502 – Bartolomé de las Casas, who will later become an ardent defender of the indigenous peoples of the Americas, goes to Cuba. For his military services there he will be given an encomienda, an estate that included the services of the Indigenous peoples of the Americas living on it.
 1503 – Mar Elijah, Patriarch of the East Syrian church, sends three missionaries "to the islands of the sea which are inside Java and to China."
 1506 – Mission work begun in Mozambique
 1508 – Franciscans begin evangelizing in Venezuela
 1509 – First church building constructed on Puerto Rico
 1510 – Dominicans begin work in Haiti
 1511 – Martin de Valencia came to believe that Psalm 58 prophesied the conversion of all unbelievers. While reflecting on the Scripture passage, he asked, "When will this be?  When will this prophecy be filled . . . we are already in the afternoon, at the end of our days, and the world's final era."  Later that same week, while reading aloud from the prophet Isaiah, he reportedly saw a vision of vast multitudes being converted and baptised. He began to pray to be chosen to preach and convert all heathen. He would die 20 years later as a missionary to Mexico.
 1512 – Dominican missionary Antonio de Montesino returns to Spain to try to convince King Ferdinand that all is not as it should be in the new western colonies. He reported that on the islands of Hispaniola (now Dominican Republic and Haiti) and Cuba, the indigenous peoples were rapidly dying out under the system of slavery used by the colonists.
 1513 – In Cuba, Bartolomé de las Casas is ordained (possibly the first ordination in the New World). Soon thereafter, Las Casas will renounce all claims to his Indian serfs
 1515 – Portuguese missionary Francisco Álvares is sent on a diplomatic mission to Dawit II, the Negus or Emperor of Abyssinia (an old name for Ethiopia)
 1515 – Portuguese missionaries begin work in Benin, Nigeria
 1517 – The Mughal Rulers of Delhi opened the door of Bengal to Christian missionaries
 1518 – Don Henrique, son of the king of the Congo, is consecrated by Pope Leo X as the first indigenous bishop from sub-Saharan Black Africa
 1519 – Two Franciscans accompany Hernán Cortés in his expedition to Mexico
 1520 – German missionary Maximilian Uhland, also known as Bernardino de San José, goes to Hispaniola with the newly appointed Bishop Alessandro Geraldini.
 1521 – Pope Leo X grants Franciscan Francis Quiñones permission and faculties to go as a missionary to the New World together with Juan Clapión
 1522 – Portuguese missionaries establish presence on coast of Sri Lanka and begin moving inland in the wake of Portuguese military units
 1523 – Martin Luther writes a missionary hymn based on Psalm 67, Es woll uns Gott genädig sein. It has been called "the first missionary hymn of Protestantism."
 1524 – Martin de Valencia goes to New Spain with 12 Franciscan friars
 1525 – Italian Franciscan missionary Giulio Zarco is sent to Michoacán on the western coast of Mexico where he will become very proficient in some of the indigenous languages
 1526 – Franciscans enter Florida; Twelve Dominican friars arrive in the Mexican capital
 1527 – Martyrs' Synod — organized by Anabaptists, it is the first Protestant missionary conference
 1528 – Franciscan missionary Juan de Padilla arrives in Mexico. He will accompany Coronado's expedition searching for the Seven Cities and eventually settle among the Quivira (now called the Wichita)
 1529 – Franciscan Peter of Ghent writes from Latin America that he and a colleague had baptized 14,000 people on one day
 1531 – Franciscan Juan de Padilla begins a series of missionary tours among Indian tribes southeast of Mexico City
 1532 – Evangelization of Peru begins when missionaries arrive with Francisco Pizarro's military expedition
 1533 – The Pechenga Monastery is founded in the Extreme North of Russia to preach Gospel to the Sami people; Augustinian order arrives in Mexico; First Christian missionaries arrive in Tonkin, what is now Vietnam
 1534 – The entire caste of Paravas on the Coromandel Coast are baptized—perhaps 20,000 people in all
 1536 – Northern Italian Anabaptist missionary Hans Oberecker is burned at the stake in Vienna.
 1537 – Pope Paul III orders that the Indigenous peoples of the Americas of the New World be brought to Christ "by the preaching of the divine word, and with the example of the good life."
 1538 – Franciscans enter Paraguay
 1539 – The Pueblos of what is now the U.S. Southwest are encountered by Spanish Franciscan missionary Marcos de Niza
 1539 – Together with two friends Ignatius of Loyola forms the Society of Jesus which is approved by Pope Paul III one year later.
 1540 – Franciscans arrive in Trinidad and are killed by cannibals
 1541 – Franciscans begin establishing missions in California
 1542 – Francis Xavier goes to Portuguese colony of Goa in West India;
 1543 – Anabaptist Menno Simons leaves the Netherlands and begins planting churches in Germany
 1544 – Franciscan Andrés de Olmos, leads group of Indian converts to Tamaulipas
 1545 – Testifying to the power that letters back home from missionaries have had, Antonio Araoz writes about Francis Xavier: "No less fruit has been obtained in Spain and Portugal through his letters than has been obtained in the Indies through his teaching."
 1546 – Xavier travels to the Indonesian islands of Morotai, Ambon, and Ternate
 1547 – Wealthy Spaniard Juan Fernández becomes a Jesuit. He will go to Japan as a missionary.
 1548 – Xavier founds the College of the Holy Name of God in Baçaim on the northwest coast of India
 1549 – Dominican Luis Cancer, who had worked among the Mayans of Guatemala and Mexico, lands at Tampa Bay (Florida) with two companions. They are immediately killed by the Calusa.
 1549 Jesuit missionaries led by Xavier arrive in Japan and built a base in Kyushu. Their activity was most successful in Kyushu, with about 100,000 to 200,000 converts, including many daimyōs.
 1550 – Printed Scriptures are available in 28 languages
 1551 – Dominican Jerome de Loaysa founds the National University of San Marcos in Lima (Peru) as well as a hospital for indigenous peoples
 1553 – Portuguese missionaries build a church in Malacca Town, Malaysia
 1554 – 1,500 converts to Christianity are reported in Siam (now called Thailand)
 1555 – John Calvin sends Huguenots to Brazil
 1555 – The first, failed, attempt to set up a Christian mission in Cambodia, by Dominican Gaspar da Cruz.
 1556 – Gaspar da Cruz spends a month preaching in Guangzhou, China.
 1557 – Jesuit bishop André de Oviedo arrives in Ethiopia with five priests to convert the local Ethiopian Christians to Catholicism.
 1558 – The Kabardian duke Saltan Idarov converts to Orthodox Christianity
 1559 – Missionary Vilela settles in Kyoto, Japan
 1560 – Gonçalo da Silveira, a Portuguese Jesuit missionary, visited the Munhumutapa Empire, where he rapidly made converts
 1562 – Diego de Landa burns the libraries of the Maya civilization
 1563 – Jesuit missionary Luis Frois, who will later write a history of Jesuit activity in Japan, arrives in that country; Ōmura Sumitada becomes the first daimyō (feudal landholder) to convert to Christianity
 1564 – Legazpi begins Augustinian work in Philippine Islands
 1565 – Jesuits arrive in Macau.
 1566 – The first Jesuit to enter what is now the United States, Pedro Martinez, is clubbed to death by fearful Indians on the sands of Fort George Island, Florida
 1567 – Missionaries Jeronimo da Cruz and Sebastiao da Canto, both Dominicans, arrive at Ayutthaya, Thailand
 1568 – In the Philippines, Diego de Herrera baptizes Chieftain Tupas of Cebu and his son
 1569 – Jeronimo da Cruz is murdered along with two newly arrived missionaries
 1570 – Ignacio Azevedo and 39 other Jesuit missionaries are killed by pirates near Palma, one of the Canary Islands, while on their way to Brazil
 1571 – Capuchin friars of the 'Strict Observance' arrive on the island of Trinidad with conquistador Don Juan Ponce of Seville.
 1572 – Jesuits arrive in Mexico
 1573 – Large-scale evangelization of the Florida Indian nations and tribes begins with the arrival of Franciscan friars; Augustinian order enters Ecuador
 1574 – Augustinian Guillermo de Santa Maria writes a treatise on the illegitimacy of the war the Spanish government was waging against the Chichimeca in the Mexican state of Michoacán
 1575 – Church building constructed in Kyoto. Built in Japanese architectural style, it was popularly called the "temple of the South Barbarians"
 1575 – Spanish Augustinians Martín de Rada and Geronimo Martín spend four months in Fujian, China, trying to arrange for long-term missionary work there. The attempt ends in failure due to unrelated events in the Philippines.
 1577 – Dominicans enter Mozambique and penetrate inland, burning Muslim mosques as they go
 1578 – King of Spain orders the bishop of Lima not to confer Holy Orders on mestizos
 1579 – Jesuit Alessandro Valignano arrives in Japan where, as "Visitor of Missions", he formulates a basic strategy for Catholic proselytism in that country. Valignano's adaptationism attempted to avoid cultural frictions by covering the gap between certain Japanese customs and Roman Catholic values.
 1580 – Japanese daimyō (feudal landholder) Arima Harunobu becomes Christian and takes the name Protasio
 1582 – Jesuits, with Michele Ruggieri and Matteo Ricci as the pioneers, begin mission work in mainland China; introduce Western science, mathematics, astronomy
 1583 – Five Jesuit missionaries are murdered near Goa (India)
 1584 – Matteo Ricci and a Chinese scholar translate a catechism into Chinese under the title Tian Zhu Shi Lu（天主實録） (A True Account of God)
 1585 – Carmelite leader Jerome Gracian meets with Martin Ignatius de Loyola, a Franciscan missionary from China. The two sign a vinculo de hermandad misionera—a bond of missionary brotherhood—by which the two orders would collaborate in missionary work in Ethiopia, China, the Philippines, and the East and West Indies.
 1586 – Portuguese missionary João dos Santos reports that locals kill elephants to protect their crops in Sofala, Mozambique.
 1587 – All foreigners ordered out of Japan when the shōgun fears they are as divisive and might present the Europeans with an opportunity to disrupt Japan. They stay but persecution escalates.
 1587 – Manteo becomes the first American Indian to be baptized by the Church of England
 1590 – A book by Belgian pastor Hadrian à Saravia has a chapter arguing that the Great Commission is still binding on the church today because the Apostles did not fulfill it completely
 1591 – First Catholic church built in Trinidad; First Chinese admitted as members of the Jesuit order
 1593 – The Franciscans arrive in Japan and establish St. Anna's hospital in Kyoto; they dispute with the Jesuits.
 1594 – First Jesuit missionaries arrive in what is today Pakistan
 1595 – Dutch East India Company chaplains expand their ministry beyond the European expatriates
 1596 – Jesuit missionaries travel across the island of Samar in the Philippines to establish mission centers on the eastern side
 1597 – Twenty-six Japanese Christians are crucified for their faith by General Toyotomi Hideyoshi in Nagasaki, Japan. Full-scale persecution destroys the Christian community by the 1620s. Converts who did not reject Christianity were killed. Many Christians went underground,  but their communities died out. Christianity left no permanent imprint on Japanese society.
 1598 – Spanish missionaries push north from Mexico into what is now the state of New Mexico .
 1599 – Jesuit Francisco Fernandez goes to what is now the Jessore District of Bangladesh and builds a church there

1600 to 1699 

 1600 – French missionaries arrive in the area of what is now Sault Ste. Marie, Michigan
 1601 – First ordination of Japanese priests
 1602 – Chinese scientist and translator Xu Guangqi is baptized
 1603 – The Jesuit Mission Press in Japan commences publication of a Japanese- Portuguese dictionary
 1604 – Jesuit missionary Abbè Jessè Flèchè arrives at Port Royal, Nova Scotia
 1605 – Roberto de Nobili goes to India
 1606 – Japanese shōgun Tokugawa Ieyasu bans Christianity
 1607 – Missionary Juan Fonte establishes the first Jesuit mission among the Tarahumara in the Sierra Madre Mountains of Northwest Mexico
 1608 – A missionary expedition into the Ceará area of Brazil fails when the Tacariju kill the Jesuit leader
 1609 – Missionary Nicolas Trigault goes to China; he will soon (1615) publish Ricci's journals in Europe
 1610 – Chinese mathematician and astronomer Li Zhizao is baptized
 1611 – Two Jesuits begin work among Mi'kmaq Indians of Nova Scotia
 1612 – Jesuits found a mission for the Abenakis in Maine
 1613 – Missionary Alvarus de Semedo goes to China
 1614 – Anti-Christian edicts issued in Japan with over 40,000 Christians being massacred
 1615 – French missionaries in Canada open schools in Trois-Rivières and Tadoussac to teach First Nations children with the hopes of converting them
 1616 – Nanjing Missionary Case in which the clash between Chinese practice of ancestor worship and Catholic doctrine ends in the deportation of foreign missionaries. Missionary Johann Adam Schall von Bell arrives in China
 1617 – Portuguese missionary Francisco de Pina arrives in Vietnam
 1618 – Portuguese Carmelites go from Persia to Pakistan to establish a church in Thatta (near Karachi)
 1619 – Dominican missionaries found the University of St. Tomas in the Philippine islands
 1620 – Carmelites enter Goa
 1621 – The Augustinians establish themselves in Chittagong
 1622 – Pope Gregory VI founds the Sacred Congregation for the Propagation of the Faith. This becomes the major Papal agency for coordinating and directing missionary work
 1623 – A stone monument (Xi'an Stele)  is unearthed in Xi'an (Si-ngan-fu), China. Its inscription, written by a Syrian monk almost a thousand years earlier and in both Chinese characters and Persian script, begins with the words, "Let us praise the Lord that the [Christian] faith has been popular in China"; it told of the arrival of a missionary, A-lo-pen (Abraham), in AD 625. Alvaro Semedo and other Jesuits soon publicize the stele's discovery in Europe.
 1624 – Persecution intensifies in Japan with 50 Christians being burned alive in Edo (now called Tokyo)
 1625 – Vietnam expels missionaries
 1626 – After entering Japan in disguise, Jesuit missionary Francis Pacheco is captured and executed at Nagasaki
 1627 – Alexander de Rhodes goes to Vietnam where in three years of ministry he baptizes 6,700 converts
 1628 – Congregation for the Evangelization of Peoples established in Rome to train "native clergy" from all over the world
 1629 – Franciscan missionary Alonzo Benavides founds Santa Clara de Capo on the border of Apache Indian country in what is now New Mexico
 1630 – An attempt is made in the El Paso, Texas area to establish a mission among the Mansos Indians
 1631 – Dutch clergyman Abraham Rogerius (anglicized as Roger), who authored Open Door to the Secrets of Heathendom (1651), begins 10 years of ministry among the Tamil people in the Dutch colony of Pulicat near Madras, India
 1632 – Zuni Indians murder a group of Franciscan missionaries who had three years earlier established the first mission to the Zunis at Hawikuh in what is now New Mexico
 1633 – Emperor Fasilides expels the Jesuit missionaries in Ethiopia; the German Lutheran Church sends Peter Heyling as the first Protestant missionary to Ethiopia.
 1634 – Jesuit missionary Jean de Brèbeuf travels to the Petun nation (in Canada) and baptizes a 40-year-old man.
 1635 – An expedition of Franciscans leaves Quito, Ecuador, to try to penetrate into Amazonia from the west. Though most of them will be killed along the way, a few will manage to arrive two years later on the Atlantic coast.
 1636 – The Dominicans of Manila (the Philippines) organize a missionary expedition to Japan. They are arrested on one of the Okinawa islands and will be eventually condemned to death by the tribunal of Nagasaki.
 1637 – When smallpox kills thousands of Native Americans, tribal medicine men blame European missionaries for the disaster
 1638 – Official ban of Christianity in Japan with death penalty; The Fountain Opened, a posthumous work of the influential Puritan writer Richard Sibbes is published, in which he says that the gospel must continue its journey "til it have gone over the whole world."
 1639 – The first women to New France as missionaries—three Ursuline Nuns—board the "St. Joseph" and set sail for New France

 1640 – Jesuit missionaries arrive on the Caribbean island of Martinique; Jesuit Lodovico Buglio arrives in Sichuan
 1641 – Jesuit missionary Cristoval de Acuna describes the Amazon River in a written report to the king of Spain
 1642 – Catholic missionaries Isaac Jogues and Rene Goupil are captured by Mohawk Indians as they return to Huron country from Quebec. Goupil was tomahawked to death while Jogues will be held for a period of time as a slave. He used his slavery as an opportunity for missionary work
 1643 – John Campanius, Lutheran missionary to the Indians, arrives in America on the Delaware River; Reformed pastor Johannes Megapolensis begins outreach to Native Americans while pastoring at Albany, New York
 1644 – John Eliot begins ministry to Algonquian Indians in North America
 1645 – After thirty years of work in Vietnam, the Jesuits are expelled from that country
 1646 – After being accused of being a sorcerer, Jesuit missionary Isaac Jogues is killed by the Iroquois
 1647 – The Discalced Carmelites begin work on Madagascar
 1648 – Baptism of Helena and other members of the imperial Ming family
 1649 – Society for the Propagation of the Gospel In New England formed to reach the Indians of New England
 1650 – The destruction of Huronia by the Iroquois puts an end to the Jesuits' dream of making the Huron Indians the focal point of their evangelism
 1651 – Count Truchsess of Wetzhausen, prominent Lutheran layman, asks the theological faculty of Wittenberg why Lutherans are not sending out missionaries in obedience to the Great Commission
 1652 – Jesuit Antonio Vieira returns to Brazil as a missionary where he will champion the cause of exploited indigenous peoples until being expelled by Portuguese colonists
 1653 – A Mohawk war party captures Jesuit Joseph Poncet near Montreal. He is tortured and will be finally sent back with a message about peace overtures
 1654 – John Eliot publishes a catechism for American Indians
 1655 – Jinga or Zinga, princess of Matamba in Angola is converted; later she will write to the Pope urging that more missionaries be sent
 1656 – First Quaker missionaries arrive in what is now Boston, Massachusetts
 1657 – Thomas Mayhew, Jr., is lost at sea during a voyage to England that was to combine an appeal for missionary funds with personal business
 1658 – After the flight of the French missionaries from his area, chief Daniel Garakonthie of the Onondaga Indians, examines the customs of the French colonists and the doctrines of the missionaries and openly begins protecting Christians in his part of what is now New York
 1659 – Jesuit Alexander de Rhodes establishes the Paris Foreign Missions Society
 1660 – Christianity is introduced into Cambodia
 1661 – George Fox, founder of the Religious Society of Friends (Quakers) sends 3 missionaries to China (although they never reached the field)
 1662 – French Jesuit missionary Julien Garnier sails for Canada
 1663 – John Eliot's translation of the Bible into one of the Algonquian languages is published (the New Testament came out two years earlier). This Bible was the first complete Bible to be printed in the New World
 1664 – Justinian Von Welz authors three powerful pamphlets on the need for world missions; he will go to Dutch Guinea (now called Surinam) where he will die after only three months
 1665 – Japanese feudal landholders (called daimyōs) were ordered to follow the shogunate's example and to appoint inquisitors to do a yearly scutiny of Christians
 1666 -John Eliot publishes his The Indian Grammar, a book written to assist in conversion work among the Indians. Described as "some bones and ribs preparation for such a work", Eliot intended his Grammar for missionaries wishing to learn the dialect spoken by the Massachusett Indians.
 1667 – The first missionary to attempt to reach the Huaorani (or Aucas), Jesuit Pedro Suarez, is slain with spears
 1668 – In a letter from his post in Canada, French missionary Jacques Bruyas laments his ignorance of the Oneida language: "What can a man do who does not understand their language, and who is not understood when he speaks. As yet, I do nothing but stammer; nevertheless, in four months I have baptized 60 persons, among whom there are only four adults, baptized in periculo mortis. All the rest are little children."
 1669 – Eager to compete with the Jesuits for conversion of the Indian Nations on the western Great Lakes, Sulpilcian missionaries François Dollier de Casson and René Bréhant de Galinée set out from Montreal with twenty-seven men in seven canoes led by two canoes of Seneca Indians
 1670 – Jesuits establish missions on the Orinoco River in Venezuela
 1671 – Quaker missionaries arrive in the Carolinas
 1672 – A chieftain on Guam kills Jesuit missionary Diego Luis de San Vitores and his Visayan assistant, Pedro Calungsod, for having baptized the chief's daughter without his permission (some accounts do say the girl's mother consented to the baptism)
 1673 – French trader Louis Jolliet and missionary Jacques Marquette visit what is now the state of Illinois, where the latter establishes a mission for Native Americans
 1674 – Vincentian mission to Madagascar collapses after 25 years of abortive effort
 1675 – An uprising on the islands of Micronesia leads to the death of three Christian missionaries
 1676 – Kateri Tekakwitha, who became known as the Lily of the Mohawks, is baptized by a Jesuit missionary. She, along with many other Native Americans, joins a missionary settlement in Canada where a syncretistic blend of ascetic indigenous and Catholic beliefs evolves.
 1678 -French missionaries Jean La Salle and Louis Hennepin discover Niagara Falls
 1679 – Writing from Changzhou, newly arrived missionary Juan de Yrigoyen describes three Christian congregations flourishing in that Chinese city
 1680 – The Pueblo Revolt begins in New Mexico with the killing of twenty-one Franciscan missionaries
 1681 – After arriving in New Spain, Italian Jesuit Eusebio Kino soon becomes what one writer described as "the most picturesque missionary pioneer of all North America." A bundle of evangelistic zeal, Kino was also an explorer, astronomer, cartographer, mission builder, ranchman, cattle king, and defender of the frontier
 1682 – 13 missionaries go to "remote cities" in East Siberia
 1683 – Missionary Louis Hennepin returns to France after exploring Minnesota and being held captive by the Dakota to write the first book about Minnesota, Description de la Louisiane
 1684 – Louis XIV of France sends Jesuit missionaries to China bearing gifts from the collections of the Louvre and the Palace of Versailles
 1685 – Consecration of first Catholic bishop of Chinese origin
 1686 – Russian Orthodox monks arrive in China as missionaries
 1687- St Joseph Vaz arrives in Sri Lanka where he revives Catholicism after persecution from the Dutch
 1687 – French activity begins in what is now Ivory Coast when missionaries land at Assinie
 1688 – New Testament translated into the Malay language (the first Bible translation into a language of southeast Asia)
 1689 – Calusa Indian chief from what is the state of Florida visits Cuba to discuss idea of having missionaries come to his people
 1690 – First Franciscan missionaries arrive in Texas
 1691 – Christian Faith Society for the West Indies was organized with a focus on evangelizing African slaves
 1692 – Chinese Kangxi Emperor permits the Jesuits to freely preach Christianity, converting whom they wish
 1693 – Jesuit missionary John de Britto is publicly beheaded in India
 1694 – Missionary and explorer Eusebio Kino becomes the first European to enter the Tucson, Arizona basin and create a lasting settlement
 1695 – China's first Russian Orthodox church building is consecrated
 1696 – Jesuit missionary Francois Pinet founds the Mission of the Guardian Angel near what is today Chicago. The mission was abandoned in 1700 when missionary efforts seemed fruitless
 1697 – To evangelize the English colonies, Thomas Bray, an Anglican preacher who made several missionary trips to North America, begins laying the groundwork for what will be the Society for the Propagation of the Gospel in Foreign Parts
 1698 – Society for Promoting Christian Knowledge organized by Anglicans
 1699 – Priests of the Quebec Seminary of Foreign Missions establish a mission among the Tamaroa Indians at Cahokia in what is now the state of Illinois

1700 to 1799 

 1700 – After a Swedish missionary's sermon in Pennsylvania, one Native American posed such searching questions that the episode was reported in a 1731 history of the Swedish church in America. The interchange is noted in Benjamin Franklin's Remarks Concerning the Savages of North America (1784).
 1701 – Society for the Propagation of the Gospel in Foreign Parts officially organized
 1702 – George Keith, returns to America as a missionary of the newly organized Society for the Propagation of the Gospel in Foreign Parts
 1703 – The Society for the Propagation of the Gospel in Foreign Parts expands to the West Indies
 1704 – French missionary priests arrive to evangelize the Chitimacha living along the Mississippi River in what is now the state of Louisiana
 1706 – Bartholomäus Ziegenbalg, German missionary, arrives in Tranquebar
 1706 – Irish-born Francis Makemie, who has been an itinerant Presbyterian missionary among the colonists of America since 1683, is finally able to organize the first American presbytery
 1707 – Italian Capuchin missionaries reach Kathmandu in Nepal. Maillard de Tournon makes public, in Nanjing, the Vatican decisions on rites, including the stipulations against the veneration of ancestors and of Confucius.
 1708- Jesuit missionary Giovanni Battista Sidotti is arrested in Japan. He is taken to Edo (now called Tokyo) to be interrogated by Arai Hakuseki
 1709 – Experience Mayhew, missionary to the Martha's Vineyard Indians, translates the Psalms and the Gospel of John into the Massachusett language. It will be a work considered second only to John Eliot's Indian Bible in terms of significant Indian-language translations in colonial New England
 1710 – First modern Bible Society founded in Germany by Count Canstein
 1711 – Jesuit Eusebio Kino, missionary explorer in southern Arizona and northern Sonora, dies suddenly in northern Mexico. Kino, who has been called "the cowboy missionary", had fought against the exploitation of Indians in Mexican silver mines.
 1712 – Using a press sent by The Society for Promoting Christian Knowledge, the Tranquebar Mission in India begins printing books in the Portuguese language
 1713 – Jesuit Ippolito Desideri goes to Tibet as a missionary
 1714 – New Testament translated into Tamil (India); the Royal Danish College of Missions is organized in Copenhagen
 1715 – Eastern Orthodox Church missionary outreach is renewed in Manchuria and Northern China
 1718 – The establishment of the Alamo Mission in San Antonio is authorized by the viceroy of Mexico. The mission was to be an educational center for Native Americans who converted to Christianity.
 1717 – Chen Mao writes to the Chinese Emperor about his concerns over Catholic missionaries and Western traders. He urgently requested an all-out prohibition of Catholic missionaries in the Qing provinces.
 1718 – Bartholomäus Ziegenbalg constructs a church building in India that is still in use today
 1719 – Isaac Watts writes missionary hymn "Jesus Shall Reign Where'er the Sun"
 1720 – Missionary Johann Ernst Gruendler dies in India. He had arrived there in 1709 with the sponsorship of the Danish Mission Society
 1721 – Mission San Juan Bautista Malibat in Baja California is abandoned due to the hostility of the Cochimi Indians, as well as to the decimation of the local population by epidemics and a water shortage. Chinese Kangxi Emperor bans Christian missionaries as a result of the Chinese Rites controversy. Hans Egede goes to Greenland under the dual auspices of the Royal Mission College and the Bergen Company.
 1723 – Robert Millar publishes A History of the Propagation of Christianity and the Overthrow of Paganism advocating prayer as the primary means of converting non-Christians
 1724 – Yongzheng Emperor bans missionary activities outside the Beijing area
 1725 – Knud Leem arrives as a missionary to the Sami people of Finnmark (Norwegian Arctic)
 1726 – John Wright, a Quaker missionary to the Native Americans, settles in southeastern Pennsylvania
 1728 – Institutum Judaicum founded in Halle as first Protestant mission center for Jewish evangelism
 1729 – Roman Catholic missionary Du Poisson becomes the first victim in the Natchez revolt. On his way to New Orleans, he had been asked to stop and say Mass at the Natchez post. He was killed in front of the altar.
 1730 – Lombard, French missionary, founds a Christian village with over 600 Indians at the mouth of Kuru river in French Guiana. A Jesuit, Lombard has been called the most successful of all missionaries in converting the Indians of French Guiana
 1731 – A missionary movement is born when Count Nicolaus Ludwig Zinzendorf attends the coronation of King Christian VI of Denmark and witnesses two of Egede's Inuit converts. Over the next two years, his Moravian Church at Herrnhut will begin its missionary outreach with work among the slaves in the Caribbean and the Inuit in Greenland.
 1732 – Alphonsus Liguori founds the Roman Catholic religious institute known as the Redemptorist Fathers with the purpose of doing missionary work among rural people
 1733 – Moravians establish their first mission in Greenland
 1734 – A missionary convinces a Groton, Connecticut church to lend its building to the Mashantucket Pequot Tribe for Christian worship services.
 1735 – John Wesley goes to Indians in Georgia as missionary with the Society for the Propagation of the Gospel in Foreign Parts
 1736 – Anti-Christian edicts in China; Moravian missionaries at work among Nenets people of Arkhangelsk
 1737 – Rev. Pugh, a missionary in Pennsylvania with The Society for the Propagation of the Gospel in Foreign Parts begins ministering to blacks. He noted that the masters of the slaves were prejudiced against them becoming Christian.
 1738 – Moravian missionary George Schmidt settles in Baviaan Kloof (Valley of the Baboons) in the Riviersonderend valley of South Africa. He begins working with the Khoikhoi people, who were practically on the threshold of extinction.
 1739 – The first missionary to the Mahican (Mohegan) Indians, John Sergeant, builds a home in Stockbridge, Massachusetts that is today a museum.
 1740 – Moravian David Zeisberger starts work among Creek people of Georgia
 1740 – Johann Phillip Fabricius, missionary, arrives in South India
 1741 – Dutch missionaries start building Christ Church building in Malacca Town, Malaysia. It will take 12 years to complete.
 1742 – Moravian Leader Count Zinzendorf visits Shekomeko, New York and baptizes six Indians
 1743 – David Brainerd starts ministry to North American Indians
 1744 – Thomas Thompson resigns his position as dean at the University of Cambridge to become a missionary. He was sent by the Society for the Propagation of the Gospel in Foreign Parts to New Jersey. Taking a special interest in the slave population there, he would later request to begin mission work in Africa. In 1751, Thompson would become the first S.P.G. missionary to the Gold Coast (modern-day Ghana)
 1745 – David Brainerd,  after preaching to Native Americans in December, wrote about the response: "They soon came in, one after another; with tears in their eyes, to know, what they should do to be saved. . . . It was an amazing season of power among them, and seemed as if God had bowed the heavens and come down ... and that God was about to convert the whole world."
 1746 – From Boston a call is issued to the Christians of the New World to enter into a seven-year "Concert of Prayer" for missionary work
 1747 – Jonathan Edwards appeals for prayer for world missions
 1748 – Roman Catholic Pedro Sanz and four other missionaries are executed, together with 14 Chinese Christians. Prior to his death, Sanz reportedly converted some of his prison guards to Christianity.
 1749 – Spanish Franciscan priest Junípero Serra (1713-1784 arrives in Mexico as a missionary. In 1767 he would go north to what is now California, zealously building missions and converting Native Americans.
 1750 – Jonathan Edwards, preacher of the First Great Awakening, having been banished from his church at Northampton, Massachusetts goes as a missionary to the nearby Housatonic Indians. Christian Frederic Schwartz goes to India with Danish-Halle Mission
 1751 – Samuel Cooke arrives in New Jersey as a missionary for the SPGFP
 1752 – Thomas Thompson, first Anglican missionary to Africa, arrives in the Gold Coast (now Ghana)
 1753 – The disappearance of Erhardt and six companions leads to temporary abandonment of Moravian missionary initiatives in Labrador.
 1754 – Moravian John Ettwein arrives in America from Germany as a missionary. Preaching to Native Americans and establishing missions, Ettwein will travel as far south as Georgia.
 1755 – The Mahican Indian settlement at Gnadenhutten, Pa. is attacked and destroyed. Moravian missionary Johann Jacob Schmick remains with the Mahicans through exile and captivity despite almost constant threats from white neighbors. Schmick will join his Indian congregation as they seek refuge in Bethlehem, follow them as captives to Philadelphia, and remain with them after they settle in Wyalusing, Pennsylvania.
 1756 – Civil unrest forces Gideon Halley away from his missionary work among the Six Nations on the Susquehanna River where he has been working for four years under the supervision of Jonathan Edwards with an appointment from the Society for Propagating the Gospel among the Indians.
 1757 – Lutherans begin ministering to Blacks in the Caribbean
 1758 – John Wesley baptizes two slaves, thus breaking the skin color barrier for Methodist societies
 1759 – Native American Samson Occom, direct descendant of the great Mahican chief Uncas, is ordained by the Presbyterians. Occom became the first American Indian to publish works in English. These included sermons, hymns and a short autobiography.
 1760 – Adam Voelker and Christian Butler arrive in Tranquebar as the first Moravian missionaries to India
 1760 – Methodists first reach the West Indies.
 1761 – The first Moravian missionary in Ohio, Frederick Post, settles on the north side of the Muskingum.
 1762 – Moravian Missionary John Heckewelder confers with Koquethagacton ("White Eyes") at the mouth of the Beaver River (Pennsylvania)
 1763 – The Presbyterian Synod of New York orders that a collection for missions be taken. In 1767 the Synod asks that this collection be done annually.
 1764 – The Moravians make a decision to expand and begin publicizing their missionary activity, particularly in the British colonies; Moravian Jens Haven makes the first of three exploratory missionary journeys to Greenland
 1765 – Suriname Governor General Crommelin convinces three Moravian missionaries to work near the head waters of the Gran Rio. They settle among the Saramaka near the Senthea Creek in Granman Abini's village where they are received with mixed feelings.
 1766 – Philip Quaque, a Fetu youth from the Cape Coast area of Ghana who spent twelve years studying in England, returns to Africa. Supported as a missionary by the Society for the Propagation of the Gospel in Foreign Parts, Quaque is first non-European ordained priest in the Church of England
 1767 – Spain expels the Jesuits from Spanish colonies in the New World
 1768 – Five United Brethren missionaries from Germany, invited by the Danish Guinea Company, arrive in the Gold Coast (now Ghana), to teach in the Cape Coast Castle schools
 1769 – Junípero Serra founds Mission San Diego de Alcalá, first of the 21 Alta California missions
 1770 – John Marrant, a free black from New York City, begins ministering cross-culturally, preaching to the American Indians. By 1775 he had carried the gospel to the Cherokee and Creek Indians as well as to groups he called the Catawar and Housaw peoples.
 1771 – Methodist Francis Asbury arrives in America; David Avery is ordained as missionary to the Oneida tribe
 1772 – After visiting Scilly Cove in Newfoundland, Canada, missionary James Balfour describes it as a "most Barbarous Lawless Place"
 1773 – Pope Clement XIV dissolves the Jesuit Order; two Dominican order missionaries beheaded in Vietnam
 1775 – John Crook is sent by Liverpool Methodists to the Isle of Man
 1776 – Cyril Vasilyevich Suchanov builds first church among Evenks of Transbaikal (or Dauria) in (Siberia); The first baptism of an Eskimo by a Lutheran pastor takes place in Labrador.
 1777 – Portuguese missionaries build a church at Hashnabad, Bangladesh
 1778 – Theodore Sladich is martyred while doing missionary work to counter Islamic influence in the western Balkans
 1780 – August Gottlieb Spangenberg writes An Account of the Manner in Which the Protestant Church of the Unitas Fratrum, or United Brethren, Preach the Gospel, and Carry On Their Missions Among the Heathen. Originally written in German, the book will be translated into English in 1788.
 1781 – In the midst of the American Revolutionary War, the British so feared Moravian missionary David Zeisberger and his influence among the Lenape (also called Delaware) and other Native Americans that they arrested him and his assistant, John Heckewelder, charging them with treason
 1782 – Freed slave George Lisle goes to Jamaica as missionary
 1783 – Moses Baker and George Gibbions, both former slaves, leave the U.S. to become missionaries in the West Indies
 1784 – First Christians reported in Korea; Yi Seung-hun back home in Korea after being baptized in China
 1784 – Thomas Coke (Methodist) submits his Plan for the Society for the Establishment of Missions Among the Heathen. Methodist missions among the "heathen" will begin in 1786 when Coke, destined for Nova Scotia, is driven off course by a storm and lands at Antigua in the British West Indies.
 1785 – Joseph White's sermon titled "On the Duty of Attempting the Propagation of the Gospel among our Mahometan and Gentoo Subjects in India" is published in the second edition of his book Sermons Containing a View of Christianity and Mahometanism, in their History, their Evidence, and their Effects. The sermon was first preached at the University of Oxford.
 1786 – John Marrant, a free black from New York City, writes in his journal that he preached to "a great number of Indians and white people" at Green's Harbor, Newfoundland. Marrant's cross-cultural ministry led him to take the Gospel to the Cherokee, Creek, Catawba (he called them the Catawar, and Housaw Indians.
 1787 – William Carey is ordained in England by the Particular Baptists and soon begins to urge that worldwide missions be undertaken.
 1788 – Dutch missionaries begin preaching the Gospel among fishermen in Bangladesh
 1789 – The Jesuits establish Georgetown University as the first US Catholic college
 1790 – Prince Williams, a freed slave from South Carolina, goes to Nassau, Bahamas, where he will start Bethel Meeting House
 1791 – One hundred and twenty Korean Christians are tortured and killed for their faith. It began when Paul Yun Ji-Chung, a noble who had become a Christian, decided not to bury his mother according to traditional Confucian custom.
 1792 – William Carey writes An Enquiry into the Obligations of Christians to use means for the conversion of the heathen and forms the Baptist Missionary Society to support him in establishing missionary work in India
 1793 – Stephen Badin ordained in U.S. Although much of Badin's ministry was pastoral work among his own countrymen, he did some outreach among the Potawatomi Indians
 1794 – Eight Russian Orthodox missionaries arrive on Kodiak Island in Alaska. Within a few months several thousand people have been baptized
 1794 – Roman Catholic missionary Zhou Wenmo enters Korea
 1795 - Roman Catholic missionary Zhou Wenmo celebrates the first mass in Korea at Easter
 1795 – The London Missionary Society is formed to send missionaries to Tahiti
 1796 – Scottish and Glasgow Missionary Societies established; In India, Johann Philipp Fabricius' translation of the Bible into Tamil is revised and published
 1797 – Netherlands Missionary Society formed; The Duff, carrying 36 lay and pastoral missionaries, sails to three islands of the South Pacific; The first Christian missionary (from the London Missionary Society) visits Hiva on the Pacific island of Tahuata; he is not well received.
 1798 – The Missionary Society of Connecticut is organized by the Congregationalists to take the gospel to the "heathen lands" of Vermont and Ohio. Its missionaries evangelized both European settlers and Native Americans.
 1799 – The Church Missionary Societyis formed by the Clapham Sect in South London, England; John Vanderkemp, Dutch physician goes to Cape Colony, Africa

1800 to 1849 

 1800 – New York Missionary Society formed; Johann Janicke founds a school in Berlin to train young people for missionary service.
 1801 – John Theodosius van der Kemp moves to Graaff Reinet to minister to the Khoikhoi (Hottentots) people. Earlier he had helped found the Netherlands Missionary Society. In 1798, he had gone to South Africa to work as a missionary among the Xhosa.
 1802 – Henry Martyn hears Charles Simeon speak of William Carey's work in India and resolves to become a missionary himself. He will sail for India in 1805.
 1803 – The Massachusetts Baptist Missionary Society votes to publish a missionary magazine. Now known as The American Baptist, the periodical is the oldest religious magazine in the U.S.
 1804 – British and Foreign Bible Society formed; Church Missionary Society enters Sierra Leone, sending 4 German Lutherans.
 1805 – The first Christian missionaries arrive in Namibia, brothers Abraham and Christian Albrecht from the London Missionary Society.
 1806 – Haystack Prayer Meeting at Williams College; Andover Theological Seminary founded as a missionary training center; Protestant missionary work begins in earnest across southern Africa.
 1807 – Robert Morrison, of the London Missionary Society established a mission in Guangzhou (Canton) in China.
 1809 – The Church's Ministry among Jewish People is established by Joseph Frey, William Wilberforce, and Lewis Way. 
 1810 – The American Board of Commissioners for Foreign Missions (ABCFM) is established.
 1811 – English Wesleyans enter Sierra Leone.
 1812 – First ABCFM foreign missionaries, Adoniram Judson and Luther Rice, arrive in Serampore, with Judson soon going to Burma.
 1813 – The Methodists form the Wesleyan Missionary Society.
 1814 –  First recorded baptism of a mainland Chinese Protestant convert, Cai Gao; American Baptist Foreign Mission Society formed; Netherlands Bible Society founded Samuel Marsden  officiated at the first service on Christmas Day to begin the Church Missionary Society work in New Zealand.
 1815 – Congregationalist minister Cyrus Kingsbury first served Cherokee in the Southeast, founding Brainerd Mission near Chickamauga, Tennessee, in 1815. 
 1815 – American Board of Commissioners for Foreign Missions open work on Ceylon, modern-day Sri Lanka through American Ceylon Mission; Basel Missionary Society organized; Richmond African Missionary Society founded
 1816 – Robert Moffat arrives in Africa; American Bible Society founded; Charlotte White, a Baptist, arrives in India, the first single American woman to become a missionary.<ref>White, Ann "Counting the Cost of Faith: America's Early Female Missionaries" Church History, Vol 57, No. 1 (Mar 1988), p. 22; Brackney, William H The A to Z of Baptists Lanham, MD: Scarecrow Press, 2009, p. 605</ref> 
 1816 – Barnabas Shaw opens the first Wesleyan mission in South Africa: Liliefontein, in the Khamiesberg Mountains (Namaqualand), among the Khoisan peoples in the northern Cape Colony.
 1817 – James Thompson, agent for British and Foreign Bible Society, begins distributing Bibles throughout Latin America.
 1818 – Missionary work begins in Madagascar with the reluctant approval of the king.
 1819 – John Scudder, Sr., missionary physician, joins the American Ceylon Mission; Wesleyan Methodists start work in Madras, India; Reginald Heber writes words to missionary classic "From Greenland's Icy Mountains". Alfred Wright (1788-1853) becomes a Presbyterian missionary to Choctaw Nation.
 1820 - Cyrus Kingsbury is sent in 1820 to establish Mayhew Mission in Choctaw Nation (present-day U.S. State of Mississippi.
 1820 – Hiram Bingham goes to Hawaii (Sandwich Islands).
 1821 – African-American Lott Carey, a Baptist missionary, sails with 28 colleagues from Norfolk, VA to Sierra Leone; Protestant Episcopal Church mission board established.
 1821 - Dwight Presbyterian Mission established in August by Cephas Washburn near present-day Russellville, Arkansas to minister to the Cherokees then living in Arkansas Territory.
 1822 –  African American Betsy Stockton is sent by the American Board of Missions to Hawaii. She thus becomes the first single woman missionary appointed by the American Board.
 1823 – Scottish Missionary Society workers arrive in Bombay, India; Liang Fa, first Chinese Protestant evangelist, is ordained by Robert Morrison; Colonial and Continental Church Society formed
 1824 – Berlin Mission Society formed.
 1825 – George Boardman goes to Burma. Congregationalist missionary Samuel Worcester sent to Brainerd Mission in Tennessee as minister to Cherokees.
 1826 – American Bible Society sends first shipment of Bibles to Mexico.
 1827 – Missionary Lancelot Edward Threlkeld reports in The Monitor that he was "advancing rapidly" in his efforts to disseminate Holy Scripture among Indigenous Australians of the Hunter and Shoalhaven Rivers.
 1828 – Pope Leo XII entrusts the mission in Korea to Paris Foreign Missions Society.
 1828 – Basel Mission begins work in the Christiansborg area of Accra, Ghana; Karl Gützlaff of the Netherlands Missionary Society lands in Bangkok, Thailand; Rhenish Missionary Society formed
 1829 – George Müller, a native of Prussia, goes to England as a missionary to the Jews; Anthony Norris Groves, an Exeter dentist, sets off as a missionary to Baghdad accompanied by John Kitto.
 1829 - Dwight Presbyterian Mission moves to Indian Territory after most Cherokees are expelled from homes in southeastern U. S. states in 1828.
 1830 – Church of Scotland missionary Alexander Duff arrives in Kolkata (formerly Calcutta); William Swan, missionary to Siberia, writes Letters on Missions, the first Protestant comprehensive treatment of the theory and practice of missions; Baptism of Taufa'ahau Tupou, King of Tonga, by a western missionary; arrival of John Williams of the London Missionary Society in Samoa, landing in Sapapali'i on Savai'i island. Dwight Presbyterian Mission reopens near Sallisaw in Indian Territory to serve Cherokees forced to move west on the Trail of Tears.
 1831 – American Congregational missionaries arrive in Thailand, withdrawing in 1849 without a single convert; four Native Americans from beyond the Rocky Mountains come east to St. Louis, Missouri seeking information on the "palefaces' religion".
 1832 – Teava, former cannibal and pioneer Pacific Islander missionary, is commissioned by John Williams to work on the Samoan island of Manono.
 1832 - Rev. Loring S. Williams established mission station Bethabara and organized the first church in the Choctaw Nation in Indian Territory (present-day Eagletown, McCurtain County, Oklahoma). 
 1832 - Alfred Wright, a medically trained Presbyterian minister was sent to Mississippi with his wife, Harriet Bunce to minister in the Choctaw nation. After traveling with a group of Choctaws on their forced emigration to Indian Territory in 1832, they decided to establish a new mission near present-day Eagletown, Oklahoma. From then until 1846, they built and operated a church and a school to minister to Choctaws living in the surrounding area. Wright named the mission Wheelock, in honor of Eleazar Wheelock, a friend and first president of Dartmouth College. Meanwhile, ignoring his own frail health, Alfred spent as much time as he could translating religious documents from English into the Choctaw language until his death in 1853.
 1833 – Baptist work in Thailand begins with John Taylor Jones; the first American Methodist missionary, Melville Cox, goes to Liberia where he dies within four months. His dying appeal was:  "Let a thousand fall before Africa be given up"; Free Will Baptist Foreign Missionary Society begins work in India.
 1834 – American Presbyterian Mission opens work in India in the Punjab; Peter Parker MD, associated with the American Board of Commissioners for Foreign Missions, first American Medical Missionary to China opens Ophthalmic Hospital at Canton.
 1835 - Rev. Cyrus Byington arrived at Bethabara Mission in 1835. established Stockbridge Mission, and spent 31 years translating both religious and secular materials, using a Choctaw-English dictionary that he had created. Byington also established Stockbridge Mission on the opposite side of the Mountain Fork River from Bethabara.
 1835 – Rhenish Missionary Society begins work among the Dayaks on Borneo (Indonesia); Daniel Wilson, Bishop of Calcutta calls India's caste system "a cancer."
 1835 – Barthélemy Bruguière sicks and dies in China before he reach Korea.
 1836 – Pierre Maubant arrives in Korea; Paris Foreign Missions Society start work in Korea.
 1836 – Plymouth Brethren begin work in Madras, India; George Müller begins his work with orphans in Bristol, England; Gossner Mission formed; Leipzig Mission Society established; Colonial Missionary Society formed; The Providence Missionary Baptist District Association is formed, one of at least six national organizations among African American Baptists whose sole objective was missionary work in Africa.
 1837 – Laurent-Joseph-Marius Imbert arrives in Korea.
 1837 – Evangelical Lutheran Church mission board established; First translation of Bible into Japanese (actual translation work done in Singapore).
 1838 – Church of Scotland Mission of Inquiry to the Jews; four Scottish ministers including Robert Murray M'Cheyne and Andrew Bonar journey to Palestine; Augustinians enter Australia.
 1839 – Entire Bible is published in language of Tahiti; three French missionaries martyred in Korea; English Protestant missionaries, including John Williams, murdered on Erromango (Vanuatu, South Pacific).
 1840 – David Livingstone is in present-day Malawi (Africa) with the London Missionary Society; American Presbyterians enter Thailand and labor for 18 years before seeing their first Thai convert; Irish Presbyterian Missionary Society formed; Welsh Calvinistic Methodist Missionary Society founded.
 1841 – Edinburgh Medical Missionary Society formed; Welsh Methodists begin working among the Khasi people of India.
 1842 – Methodist Missionary, Thomas Birch Freeman arrives in Badagry, Nigeria.Abi Olowe, 2007, Great Revivals Great Revivalist, Omega Publishers
 1842 – Church Missionary Society enters Badagry, Lagos.
 1842 – Gossner Mission Society receives royal sanction; Norwegian Missionary Society formed in Stavanger.
 1842 – Christian Mission to the Jews (CMJ) establishes Christ Church, first Anglican church in the Old City of Jerusalem.
 1843 – Baptist John Taylor Jones translates New Testament into the Thai language; British Society for the Propagation of the Gospel among the Jews formed.
 1843 - Presbyterian missionary Robert M. Loughridge comes to Indian Territory (present-day Oklahoma as missionary to Creek Indians and establishes Koweta Mission. In 1850, he establishes Tullahassee Mission. Both missions were abandoned after the outbreak of the American Civil War.
 1843 - Twenty-four West Indian Moravians recruited by the Basel Mission and the Danish missionary, Andreas Riis, sail to the Gold Coast, now Ghana to start mission work
 1844 – German Johann Krapf of the Church Missionary Society begins work in Mombasa on the Kenya Coast; first Young Men's Christian Association (YMCA) formed by George Williams; George Smith and Thomas McClatchie sail for China as the first two CMS missionaries to that country.
 1844 Hans Paludan Smith Schreuder, missionary, arrives in Port Natal, South Africa.
 1845 – Southern Baptist Convention mission organization founded.
 1846 – The London Missionary Society establishes work on Niue, a South Pacific island which westerners had named the "savage island".
 1847 – Protestant Rhenish Missionary Society begins operations in China.
 1847 – Presbyterian William Burns goes to China, translates The Pilgrim's Progress into Chinese; Moses White sails to China as a Methodist medical missionary.
 1847 John Christian Frederick Heyer, missionary, arrives in Andhra Pradesh, India.
 1848 – Charles Forman goes to Punjab; Johannes Rebmann, German missionary with the Church Missionary Society, arrive at Mount Kilimanjaro. Initially, the story of a snow-covered peak near the equator was scoffed at.
 1849 – Johann Krapf of the Church Missionary Society was the first European to reach Mount Kenya. Just weeks after arriving on the Melanesian island of Anatom, missionary John Geddie wrote in his journal: "In the darkness, degradation, pollution and misery that surrounds me, I will look forward in the vision of faith to the time when some of these poor islanders will unite in the triumphant song of ransomed souls, 'Unto Him that loved us, and washed us from our sins in His own blood.'"

 1850 to 1899 
 1850 – On the occasion of Karl Gützlaff's visit to Europe, the Berlin Ladies Association for China is established in conjunction with the Berlin Missionary Association for China. Work in China will commence in 1851 with the arrival of Hermandine Neumann in Hong Kong. Rev. Thomas Valpy French, came to India in 1850, founded St. John's College, Agra, and became first Bishop of Lahore in 1877.
 1851 – Allen Gardiner and six missionary colleagues die of exposure and starvation at Patagonia on the southern tip of South America because a re-supply ship from England arrives six months late.
 1852 – Zenana (women) and Medical Missionary Fellowship formed in England to send out single women missionaries
 1853- The Hermannsburg Missionary Society, founded in 1849 by Louis Harms, has finished training its first group of young missionaries. They are sent to Africa on a ship (the Candace) which had been built using money entirely from donations.
 1854 – New York Missionary Conference, guided by Alexander Duff, ponders the question: "To what extent are we authorized by the Word of God to expect the conversion of the world to Christ?"; Henry Venn, secretary of the Church Missionary Society, sets out ideal of self-governing, self-supporting and self-propagating churches; Hudson Taylor arrives in China
 1855 – Henry Steinhauer is ordained as a Canadian Methodist missionary to North American Indians and posted to Lac La Biche, Alberta. Steinhauer's missionary work had actually begun 15 years earlier in 1840 when he was assigned to Lac La Pluie to assist in translating, teaching and interpreting the Ojibwa and Cree languages.
 1856 – Presbyterians start work in Colombia with the arrival of Henry Pratt
 1856 – Siméon-François Berneux arrives in Korea
 1857 – Bible translated into Tswana language; Board of Foreign Missions of Dutch Reformed Church set up; four missionary couples killed at the Fatehgarh mission during the Indian Mutiny of 1857; Publication of David Livingstone's book Missionary Travels and Researches in South Africa 1858 – John G. Paton begins work in New Hebrides; Basel Evangelical Missionary Society begins work in western Sumatra (Indonesia)
 1859 – Presbyterian minister Rev. Ashbell Green Simonton arrives in Rio de Janeiro.
 1859 – Protestant missionaries arrive in Japan; Revivals in North America and the British Isles generate interest in overseas missions; Albert Benjamin Simpson (founder of Christian and Missionary Alliance) is converted by the revival ministry of Henry Grattan Guinness
1860 – British Syrian Schools Association (forerunner to MECO and SIM) set up by Elizabeth Bowen Thompson
 1861 – Protestant Stundism arises in the village of Osnova of modern-day Ukraine; Sarah Doremus founds the Women's Union Missionary Society; Episcopal Church opens work in Haiti; Rhenish Mission goes to Indonesia under Ludwig Nommensen
 1862 – Paris Evangelical Missionary Society opens work in Senegal; the first dictionary of the Samoan language published, written by Rev George Pratt of the London Missionary Society.
 1863 – Robert Moffat, missionary to Africa with the London Missionary Society, publishes his book Rivers of Water in a Dry Place, Being an Account of the Introduction of Christianity into South Africa, and of Mr. Moffat's Missionary Labours 1865 – The China Inland Mission is founded by James Hudson Taylor; James Laidlaw Maxwell plants first viable church in Taiwan. Salvation Army founded in London by William Booth. Van Dyck Bible (in Arabic) completed. 
 1865 –  Ernst Faber arrives in China. 
 1865. Henry Venn (1796-1873) of the Church Missionary Society called for "three-self" native churches: self-supporting, self-governing, and self-propagating.
 1866 – Charles Haddon Spurgeon invents the Wordless Book, which is widely used in cross-cultural evangelism; Theodore Jonas Meyer (1819–1894), a converted Jew serving as a Presbyterian missionary in Italy, nurses those dying in a cholera epidemic until he himself falls prey to the disease. Barely surviving, he becomes a peacemaker between Catholics and Protestants; Robert Thomas, known as the first Protestant martyr in Korea, is beaten to death by locals after getting involved in kidnapping, shooting & killing locals in Pyongyang, Korea
 1867 – Methodists start work in Argentina; Scripture Union established; Lars Olsen Skrefsrud and Hans Peter Børresen  begin working among the Santals of India.
 1868 – Robert Bruce goes to Iran, Canadian Baptist missionary Americus Timpany begins work among the Telugu people in India.
 1869 – The first Methodist women's missionary magazine, The Heathen Women's Friend, begins publication. Riot in Yangzhou, China destroys China Inland Mission house and nearly leads to open war between Britain and China.
 1870 – Clara Swain, the very first female missionary medical doctor, arrives at Bareilly, India; Orthodox Missionary Society founded
 1871 – William Sloan went to Faeroe Islands commended from a brethren assembly
 1871 – Henry Stanley finds David Livingstone in central Africa
 1872 – First All-India Missionary Conference with 136 participants; George Leslie Mackay plants church in northern Taiwan; Lottie Moon appointed as missionary to China
 1873 – Regions Beyond Missionary Union founded in London in connection with the East London Training Institute for Home and Foreign Missions; first Scripture portion (Gospel of Luke) translated into Pangasinan, a language of the Philippines, by Alfonso Lallave
 1874 – Gustav Warneck founded the Allgemeine Missions Zeitschrift in Gütersloh / Germany, the first scientific missionary periodical; Lord Radstock's first visit to St. Petersburg, Russia, and the beginning of an evangelical awakening among the St. Petersburg nobility; Albert Sturges initiates the Interior Micronesia Mission in the Mortlock Islands under the leadership of Micronesian students from Ohwa
 1875 – The Foreign Christian Missionary Society organized within the Christian Church (Disciples of Christ) and Church of Christ movements; Clah, a Canadian Indian convert, brought Christianity to natives at Ft. Wangel, Alaska. He assumed the name of Philip McKay.
 1875 - The Society of the Divine Word, a Roman Catholic missionary community, is founded by Arnold Jannsen in Steyl, Holland.
 1876 – In September, a rusty ocean steamer arrives at a port on the Calabar River in what is now Nigeria. That part of Africa was then known as the White Man's Grave. The only woman on board that ship is 29-year-old Mary Slessor, a missionary.
 1877 – James Chalmers goes to New Guinea; Presbyterians Sheldon Jackson and missionary-widow Amanda McFarland arrive at Ft. Wrangel, Alaska where they join Philip McKay (né Clah) to start missionary work. McFarland was the first white woman in Alaska, and renowned as "Alaska's Courageous Missionary." China Inland Mission opens up settled mission work in Sichuan.
 1878 – Mass movement to Christ begins in Ongole, India
 1880 – Woman missionary doctor Fanny Butler goes to India; Missionary periodical The Gospel in All Lands is launched by A. B. Simpson; Justus Henry Nelson and Fannie Bishop Capen Nelson begin 45 years of service in Belém, Pará, Brazil, establishing the first Protestant Church in Amazonia in 1883
 1880 – Conversion of Xi Shengmo (1836-1896), a brilliant Confucian philosopher who after being freed opium, dedicated his life to preaching the Gospel and creating of rehabilitation centers for thousands of opium addicts in the Chinese province of Shanxi and other cities and towns such as Chao-ch'eng, Teng-ts'uen, Hoh-chau, T'ai-yuan and Ping-yang, along with his wife. In 1906, there were, in all, 45 rehabilitation centers and 300,000 healed.Austin, Alvyn James, "Pilgrims and Strangers: The China Inland Mission in Britain, Canada, the United States and China 1865-1990" (Ph.D. diss., York University, North York, Ontario, 1996).Latourette, Kenneth Scott, A History of Christian Missions in China (1966).
 1881 – Methodist work in Lahore, Pakistan starts in the wake of revivals under Bishop William Taylor; North Africa Mission (now Arab World Ministries) founded on work of Edward Glenny in Algeria
 1881 – Home & Foreign Mission Fund (now known as Interlink) was established in Glasgow as a missionary service group for brethren missionaries from Scotland
 1882 – James Gilmour, London Missionary Society missionary to Mongolia, goes home to England for a furlough. During that time he published a book: Among the Mongols. It was so well-written that one critic wrote, "Robinson Crusoe has turned missionary, lived years in Mongolia, and wrote a book about it." Concerning the author, the critic said, "If ever on earth there lived a man who kept the law of Christ, and could give proof of it, and be absolutely unconscious that he was giving it to them, it is this man whom the Mongols called 'our Gilmour.'"
 1882 - Alice Mary Robertson, granddaughter of missionary Samuel Worcester, founds Nuyaka Mission near present-day Okmulgee, Oklahoma, primarily ministering to Creek Nation.
 1883 – Salvation Army enters West Pakistan; A.B. Simpson organizes The Missionary Union for the Evangelization of the World. The first classes of the Missionary Training College are held in New York City. Zaire Christian and Missionary Alliance mission field opens.
 1884 – David Torrance is sent by the Jewish Mission of the Free Church of Scotland as a medical missionary to Palestine
 1884 – Alice Hyson is sent by Mrs. F. E. H. Haines, and the Women's Home Missionary Society of the Presbyterian Church, to Taos, New Mexico 
 1885 – Horace Grant Underwood, Presbyterian missionary, and Henry Appenzeller, Methodist missionary, arrive in Korea; Scottish Ion Keith-Falconer goes to Aden on the Arabian peninsula; "Cambridge Seven" -- C. T. Studd, M. Beauchamp, W. W. Cassels, D. E. Hoste, S. P. Smith, A. T. Podhill-Turner, C. H. Polhill-Turner—go to China as missionaries with the China Inland Mission
 1886 – Student Volunteer Movement launched as 100 university and seminary students at Moody's conference grounds at Mount Hermon, Massachusetts, sign the Princeton Pledge which says:  "I purpose, God willing, to become a foreign missionary." 1886 Johann Flierl, missionary, arrives in New Guinea
 1887 -The Hundred missionaries deployed in one year in China under the China Inland Mission. Dr. William Cassidy, a Toronto medical doctor, was ordained as the Christian and Missionary Alliance's first missionary preacher. Unfortunately, en route to China, he died of smallpox. However, Cassidy's death has been called the "spark that ignited the Alliance missionary blaze."
 1888 – Jonathan Goforth sails to China; Student Volunteer Movement for foreign missions officially organized with John R. Mott as chairman and Robert Wilder as traveling secretary. The movement's motto, coined by Wilder, was:  "The evangelization of the world in this generation.; Scripture Gift Mission (now Lifewords) founded
 1889 – Missionary linguist and folklorist Paul Olaf Bodding arrives in India, Santhal Parganas, and continues the work among the Santals started by Skrefsrud and Børresen in 1867; North Africa Mission enters Tripoli as first Protestant mission in Libya
 1890 - Presbyterian missionary, Robert M. Loughridge, founded the First Presbyterian Church of Coweta. 
 1890 – Central American Mission founded by C. I. Scofield, editor of the Scofield Reference Bible; Methodist Charles Gabriel writes missionary song "Send the Light"; John Livingston Nevius of China visits Korea to outline his strategy for missions: 1) Each believer should be a productive member of society and active in sharing his faith; 2) The church in Korea should be distinctly Korean and free of foreign control; 3) The leaders of the Korean church will be selected and trained from its members; 4) Church buildings will be built by Koreans with their own resources; Fredrik Franson founds the Scandinavian Alliance Mission in Chicago, later known as The Evangelical Alliance Mission. 
 1891 – Samuel Zwemer goes to Basra in southern Iraq, having founded the Arabian Mission in 1890; Helen Chapman sails for the Congo (Zaire). She married a Danish missionary, William Rasmussen, whom she met during the voyage.
 1892 – Redcliffe College, Centre for Mission Training founded in Chelsea, London
 1892 – Open Air Campaigners was founded in Sydney, Australia as "Coogee Open Air Mission".
 1893 – Eleanor Chestnut goes to China as Presbyterian medical missionary; Sudan Interior Mission (SIM) founded by Rowland Bingham, a graduate of Nyack College
 1894 – Soatanana Revival begins among Lutheran and LMS churches in Madagascar, lasting 80 years
 1895 – Africa Inland Mission formed by Peter Cameron Scott; Japan Bible Society established; Roland Allen sent as missionary for the Society for the Propagation of the Gospel in Foreign Parts to its North China Mission. Amy Carmichael arrives in India.
 1896 – Ödön Scholtz founds the first Hungarian Lutheran foreign mission periodical Külmisszió 1897 – Presbyterian Church (USA) begins work in Venezuela
 1897 – Russian Orthodox Church decided to establish a mission in Korea
 1898 – Theresa Huntington leaves her New England home for the Middle East. For seven years she will work as an American Board missionary in Elazığ (Kharput) in the Ottoman Empire. Her letters home will be published in a book titled Great Need over the Water; Archibald Reekie of the Canadian Baptist Ministries arrives in Oruro as the first Protestant missionary to Bolivia. The work of Canadian Baptists led to the guarantee of freedom of religion in Bolivia in 1905.
 1899 – James Rodgers arrives in Philippines with the Presbyterian Mission; Central American Mission enters Guatemala

 1900 to 1949 

 1900 – First Orthodox missionary from Russia enters Korea
 1900 – American Friends open work in Cuba; Ecumenical Missionary Conference in Carnegie Hall, New York (162 mission boards represented); 189 missionaries and their children killed in Boxer Rebellion in China; South African Andrew Murray writes The Key to the Missionary Problem in which he challenges the church to hold weeks of prayer for the world
 1901 – Nazarene John Diaz goes to Cape Verde Islands; Maude Cary sails for Morocco;  Oriental Missionary Society founded by Charles Cowman (his wife is the compiler of popular devotional book Streams in the Desert); Missionary James Chalmers killed and eaten by cannibals in Papua New Guinea
 1902-1927 – With world attention focused on the anti-Western Boxer Rebellion, American Protestants made missions to China a high priority. They supported 500 missionaries in 1890, more than 2000 in 1914, and 8300 in 1920. By 1927 they opened 16 American universities in China, six medical schools, and four theology schools, together with 265 middle schools and a large number of elementary schools. The number of converts was not large, but the educational influence was dramatic.
 1902 – Swiss members of the Plymouth Brethren enter Laos; 
 1902 – California Yearly Meeting of Friends opens work in Guatemala
 1903 – First Orthodox parish in Korea opens
 1903 – Church of the Nazarene enters Mexico
 1903 –  First group baptism at Sattelberg Mission Station under Christian Keyser in New Guinea paves way for mass conversions during the following years
 1904 – Premillennialist theologian William Eugene Blackstone begins teaching that the world has already been evangelized, citing Acts 2:5, 8:4, Mark 16:20 and Colossians 1:23
 1904 – European Christian Mission was founded in Estonia by J.P. Raud. Today it is known as European Christian Mission International.
 1905 – Gunnerius Tollefsen is converted at a Salvation Army meeting under the preaching of Samuel Logan Brengle. Later he would become a missionary to the Belgian Congo and then first mission secretary of the Norwegian Pentecostal movement.
 1905 – Sadhu Sundar Singh, an Indian missionary, former adherent of Sikhism, begins his ministry as sadhu preaching in Northern India and Tibet. From 1918-1922, he travels to preach throughout the world, but finishes his career in new missions to Tibet.
 1906 – The Evangelical Alliance Mission (TEAM) opens work in Venezuela with T. J. Bach and John Christiansen
 1907 – Massive revival meetings in Korea; Harmon Schmelzenbach sails for Africa; Presbyterians and Methodists open Union Theological Seminary in Manila, Philippines; Bolivian Indian Mission founded by George Allen
 1908 – Gospel Missionary Union opens work in Colombia with Charles Chapman and John Funk; Pentecostal movement enters Rome and southern Italy as well as Egypt
 1909 – Pentecostal movement reaches Chile through ministry of American Methodist Willis Hoover
 1910 – Edinburgh Missionary Conference held in Scotland, presided over by John Mott, beginning modern Protestant ecumenical cooperation in missions
 1911 – Christian & Missionary Alliance enters Cambodia and Vietnam
 1912 – Conference of British Missionary Societies formed;The archive of CBMS is held by SOAS Special Collections International Review of Missions begins publication
 1913 – C.T. Studd establishes Heart of Africa Mission, now called WEC International; African-American Eliza Davis George sails from New York for Liberia; William Whiting Borden dies in Egypt while preparing to take the gospel to the Muslims in China
  1914-1918 World War I numerous missionaries in Africa and Asia in British, French, German and Belgian colonies are expelled or detained for the duration of the war, if their nation was at war with the colonial authority.
  1914-1918 The World War reduced the enthusiasm for missions, and led to growing doubts about the wisdom of cultural imperialism in dealing with foreign peoples.Nathan D. Showalter, The End of a Crusade: The Student Volunteer Movement for Foreign Missions and the Great War (1998).
 1914 – Large-scale revival movement in Uganda; C.T. Studd reports a revival movement in the Congo
 1914 Paul Olaf Bodding completes his translation of the Bible into the Santali language.
 1915 – Founded in 1913 in Nanjing, China as a women's Christian college, Ginling College officially opens with eight students and six teachers. It was supported by four missions: the Northern Baptists, the Christian Church (Disciples of Christ), the Methodists, and the Presbyterians.
 1916 – Rhenish missionaries are forced to leave Ondjiva in southern Angola under pressure from the Portuguese authorities and Chief Mandume of the Kwanyama. By then, four congregations existed with a confessing membership of 800.
 1917 – Interdenominational Foreign Mission Association (IFMA) founded
 1919 – The Union Version of Bible in Chinese is published; Gospel Missionary Union enters Sudan and Mali
 1920 – Baptist Mid-Missions formed by William Haas; Church of the Nazarene enters Syria; Columbans enter Australia and New Zealand
 1921 – Founding of International Missionary Council (IMC); Norwegian Mission Council formed; Columbans enter China
 1922 – Nazarenes enter Mozambique
 1923 – Scottish missionaries begin work in British Togoland
 1924 – Bible Churchman's Missionary Society opens work in Upper Burma; Baptist Mid-Missions begins work in Venezuela
 1925 - Daniel Fleming published Whither Bound in Missions (YMCA Press), challenging the over-emphasis on conversions. Missions should instead focus on fighting evils such as materialism, racial injustice, war and poverty.
 1925 – E. Stanley Jones, Methodist missionary to India, writes The Christ of the Indian Road 1926 – Charles J. McDonald, a Southern Baptist layman, started work in the town of Wahiawa, Territory of Hawaii, with a Sunday School which eventually became the First Baptist Church of Wahiawa.
 1927 – Ngulhao Thomsong translates the Bible into Thadou-Kuki Language East African revival movement (Balokole) emerges in Rwanda and moves across several other countries
 1928 – Cuba Bible Institute (West Indies Mission) opens; Jerusalem Conference of International Missionary Council; foundation of Borneo Evangelical Mission by Hudson Southwell, Frank Davidson and Carey Tolley.
 1929 – Christian & Missionary Alliance enters East Borneo (Indonesia) and Thailand
 1930 – Christian & Missionary Alliance starts work among Baouli tribe in the Ivory Coast
 1931 – Franciscan missionary the Venerable Gabriele Allegra arrives in Hunan China from Italy to start translating the Bible
 1931 – HCJB radio station started in Quito, Ecuador by Clarence Jones; Baptist Mid-Missions enters Liberia
 1932 - William Ernest Hocking, et al. Re-Thinking Missions: A Laymen’s Inquiry After One Hundred Years marks the turning away from traditional missions by the mainstream Protestant denominations, leaving the field to the evangelicals and fundamentalists.William Ernest Hocking et al. Re Thinking Missions A Laymen S Inquiry After One Hundred Years (1932) online
 1932 – Assemblies of God open mission work in Colombia; Laymen's Missionary Inquiry report published
 1933 – Gladys Aylward (subject of movie The Inn of the Sixth Happiness) arrives in China; Columbans enter Korea
 1934 – William Cameron Townsend begins the Summer Institute of Linguistics; Columbans enter Japan
 1935 – Frank C. Laubach, American missionary to the Philippines, perfects the "Each one teach one" literacy program, which has been used worldwide to teach 60 million people to read
 1936 – With the outbreak of civil war in Spain, missionaries are forced to leave that country.
 1937 – After expulsion of missionaries from Ethiopia by Italian invaders, widespread revival erupts among Protestant (SIM) churches in south; Child Evangelism Fellowship founded by Jesse Irvin Overholzer
 1938 – Madras World Missionary Conference held; Dutch missiologist Hendrik Kraemer publishes his seminal work The Christian Message in a non-Christian World; West Indies Mission enters Dominican Republic; Church Missionary Society forced out of Egypt; Dr. Orpha Speicher completes construction of Reynolds Memorial Hospital in central India
 1939-1945 – World War II  numerous missionaries in Africa and Asia in British, French and Belgian colonies are expelled or detained for the duration of the war, if their nation was at war with the colonial authority
 1939 – A sick missionary, Joy Ridderhof, makes a recording of gospel songs and a message and sends it into the mountains of Honduras. It is the beginning of Gospel Recordings
 1940 – Marianna Slocum begins translation work in Mexico; Military police in Japan arrest the executive officers of the Salvation Army
 1942 – William Cameron Townsend founds Wycliffe Bible Translators; New Tribes mission founded with a vision to reach the tribal peoples of Bolivia
 1943 - CBFMS Conservative Baptist Foreign Mission Society [now WorldVenture]  was formed sending Missionaries to the CONGO, South America and Philippines, now in over 60 countries.
 1943 – Five missionaries with New Tribes Mission martyred; 11 American Baptist missionaries beheaded in the Philippines by Japanese soldiers
 1944 – Missionaries return to Suki, Papua New Guinea after withdrawal of the Japanese military
 1945 – Mission Aviation Fellowship formed; Far East Broadcasting Company (FEBC) founded; Evangelical Foreign Missions Association formed by denominational mission boards K.S. Latourette completes his seven volume set A history of the expansion of Christianity 
 1945 – The Venerable Gabriele Allegra establishes the Studium Biblicum Franciscanum in Beijing
 1946 - Thomas Tien Ken-sin, SVD is named the first Chinese Cardinal by Pope Pius XII. He is exiled from China in 1951 by the Communist regime.
 1946 – First Inter-Varsity missionary convention (now called "Urbana"); United Bible Societies formed
 1947 – Whitby World Missionary Conference in Canada; Conservative Baptist Foreign Mission Society begins work among the Senufo people in the Ivory Coast
 1948 – Alfredo del Rosso merges his Italian Holiness Mission with the Church of the Nazarene, thus opening Nazarene work on the European continent; Southern Baptist Convention adopts program calling for the tripling of the number of missionaries.
 1949 – Southern Baptist Mission board opens work in Venezuela, Mary Tripp sent out by CEF Child Evangelism Fellowship to the Netherlands.
 1949 – Russian Orthodox Church stops in all activities in Korea.

 1950 to 1999 
 1950 – Paul Orjala arrives in Haiti; radio station 4VEH, owned by East and West Indies Bible Mission, starts broadcasting from near Cap-Haïtien, Haiti
 1951 –  Communist government of China expels all Christian missionaries; the void was more than filled by a Chinese Church, 25% of which consisted of independent churches.
 1951 –  Eastern Orthodoxy is re-introduces in Korea by Greeks, and disseminates after almost 51 years since its first introduction in 1900
 1951 – World Evangelical Alliance organized; Bill and Vonette Bright create Campus Crusade for Christ at UCLA; Alaska Missions is founded (later to be renamed InterAct Ministries).
 1952 – Willingen World Missionary Conference in Germany; Trans World Radio founded
 1953 – Walter Trobisch, who would publish I loved a girl in 1962, begins pioneer missionary work in northern Cameroon
 1954 – Mennonite Board of Missions and Charities opens work in Cuba; Argentina Revival breaks out during Tommy Hicks crusade; Augustinians re-established in Japan; Columbans  enter Chile
 1955 – Korean Orthodox Church lies under the jurisdiction of the Ecumenical Patriarchate of Constantinople
 1955 – Donald McGavran publishes Bridges of God; Dutch missionary "Brother Andrew" makes first of many Bible smuggling trips into Communist Eastern Europe;
 1956 – U.S. missionaries Jim Elliot, Pete Fleming, Edward McCully, Nate Saint, and Roger Youderian are killed by Huaorani Indians in eastern Ecuador. (See Operation Auca)
 1957 – East Asia Christian Conference (EACC) founded at Prapat, Sumatra, Indonesia
 1958 – Rochunga Pudaite completes translation of Bible into Hmar language (India) and was appointed the leader of the Indo-Burma Pioneer Mission; Missionaries Elisabeth Elliot and Rachel Saint make first peaceful contact with the Huaorani tribe in Ecuador.
 1959 – Radio Lumière founded in Haiti by West Indies Mission (now World Team); Josephine Makil becomes the first African-American to join Wycliffe Bible Translators; Feba Radio founded in UK.
 1960 – Kenneth Strachan starts Evangelism-in-Depth in Central America; 18,000 people in Morocco reply to newspaper ad by Gospel Missionary Union offering free correspondence course on Christianity; Loren Cunningham founds Youth with a Mission; The Asia Evangelistic Fellowship (AEF), one of the largest Asian indigenous missionary organisations, is launched in Singapore by G. D. James
 1961 – International Missionary Council (IMC) integrated into the World Council of Churches (WCC) and renamed Commission on World Mission and Evangelism (CWME); International Christian radio stations now number 30
 1962 – Don Richardson goes to Sawi tribe in Papua New Guinea; Operation Mobilisation founded in Mexico by George Verwer
 1963 – Theological Education by Extension movement launched in Guatemala by Ralph Winter and James Emery
 1964 – Young missionary and pilot Jerry Douglas Witt; is presumably shot down over the mining town of Minas Las Coloradas, Zacatecas Mexico while dropping Gospels of St. John from his Cessna 170B, killing him and a young Mexican national who was with him; In separate incidents, rebels in the Congo kill missionaries Paul Carlson, Phyllis Rine and Irene Ferrel as well as brutalizing missionary doctor Helen Roseveare; Carlson is featured on December 4 Time magazine cover; Hans von Staden of the Dorothea Mission proposes to Patrick Johnstone that he write the book now titled Operation World 1966 – Red Guards destroy churches in China; Berlin Congress on Evangelism; Missionaries expelled from Burma; God's Smuggler published
 1967 – All foreign missionaries expelled from Guinea
 1968 – The Studium Biblicum Translation of the Bible is published in Chinese by the Venerable Gabriele Allegra
 1968 – Wu Yung and others form the Chinese Missions Overseas in order to send out missionaries from Taiwan to do cross-cultural ministry; Augustinian order re-established in India
 1969 – OMF International begins "industrial evangelism" to Taiwan's factory workers
 1970 – Fellowship Associates of Medical Evangelism (FAME) Founded in Columbus, IN. Disrupting the Crisis of the lack of access to healthcare to the world's most vulnerable<www.fameworld.org. Frankfurt Declaration on Mission; Operation Mobilisation launches MV Logos ship; Abp. Makarios III (Mouskos) of Cyprus baptizes 10,000 into the Orthodox Church in Kenya.
 1971 – Gustavo Gutierrez publishes A Theology of Liberation 1972 – American Society of Missiology founded with journal Missiology 1973 – Services by Billy Graham attract four and a half million people in six cities of Korea; first All-Asa Mission Consultation convenes in Seoul, Korea with 25 delegates from 14 countries; Mission to the World is founded in Georgia
 1974 – Lausanne Congress on World Evangelization takes place in Lausanne / Switzerland; Missiologist Ralph Winter presents the concept of "hidden" or unreached peoples. Lausanne Covenant is written and ratified
 1975 – Sotirios Trambas arrives in Seoul
 1975 – Missionaries Armand Doll and Hugh Friberg imprisoned in Mozambique after communist takeover of government
 1976 – U.S. Center for World Mission founded in Pasadena, California; 1600 Chinese assemble in Hong Kong for the Chinese Congress on World Evangelization; Islamic World Congress calls for withdrawal of Christian missionaries; Peace Child by Don Richardson appears in Reader's Digest. 1977 – Evangelical Fellowship of India sponsors the All-India Congress on Mission and Evangelization
 1978 – LCWE Consultation on Gospel and Culture in Willowbank, Bermuda; Columbans enter Taiwan
 1979 – Production of JESUS film commissioned by Bill Bright of Campus Crusade for Christ; Ted Fletcher founds Pioneers, a missionary agency with a focus on "unreached people groups"; Columban missionaries enter Pakistan at the request of the Bishop of Lahore
 1980 – Philippine Congress on Discipling a Whole Nation; Lausanne Congress on World Evangelism Conference in Pattaya
 1981 – Colombian terrorists kidnap and kill Wycliffe Bible Translator Chet Bitterman; Project Pearl: one million Bibles are delivered in a single night to thousands of waiting believers in China
 1982 – Story on "The New Missionary" makes December 27 cover of Time magazine; Andes Evangelical Mission (formerly Bolivian Indian Mission) merges into SIM (formerly Sudan Interior Mission)
 1983 – Missionary Athletes International, a global soccer ministry, founded by Tim Conrad
 1984 – Founding of The Mission Society for United Methodists, a voluntary missionary sending agency within the United Methodist Church; rebranded in 2006 to The Mission Society; Founding of STEM (Short Term Evangelical Mission teams) ministry by Roger Petersen signals the rising importance of Short-term missions groups
 1985 – Founding of Every Child Ministries, a mission organization focused on African children and youth, with special attention to groups of neglected, abused or marginalized children, founded by John and Lorella Rouster with DR Congo (then Zaire) as its first field of service
 1985 – Howard Foltz founds Accelerating International Mission Strategies (AIMS)
 1987 – Second International Conference on Missionary Kids (MKs) held in Quito, Ecuador
 1989 - Missionary pathologist, Dr. Ron Guderian, develops cure for and helps to elimatinate River Blindless in Ecuador. He also develops cure that reverses effect of snake venom, saving the lives of many within very rural villages in Ecuador. This leads to many conversions in Ecuador.
 1989 – The International Christian Fellowship, a small mission organisation operating in Sri Lanka, south India and the Philippines, became part of SIM. The Lausanne Congress II on World Evangelization Lausanne II, an evangelical world missions conference, takes place in Manila / Philippines; the concept of 10/40 Window emerges; Adventures In Missions (Georgia) (AIM) Short-term missions agency founded by Seth Barnes; "Ee-Taow" video released by New Tribes Mission. 
 1990 – YWAM missionaries Jeff and Els Woodke begin work with Tuareg and Wodaabe pastoralists in Abalak, Niger.
 1991 – The Marxist government of Ethiopia is overthrown and missionaries are able to return to that country
 1992 – World Gospel Mission (National Holiness Missionary Society) starts work in Uganda
 1993 – Trans World Radio starts broadcasting from a 250,000-watt shortwave transmitter in Russia; Anglican Frontier Missions founded
 1994 – Liibaan Ibraahim Hassan, a convert to Christianity in Somalia, is martyred by Islamic militants in the capital city of Mogadishu;
 1995 – Missionary Don Cox abducted in Quito, Ecuador
 1996 – Nazarenes enter Hungary, Kazakhstan, Pakistan
 1997 – Foreign Mission Board and Home Mission Board of Southern Baptist Convention become the International Mission Board and North American Mission Board with ten thousand missionaries
 1998 – Ambrosios-Aristotelis Zografos arrives in Seoul. African Evangelical Fellowship (AEF) merges with SIM.
 1999 – Trans World Radio goes on the air from Grigoriopol (Moldova) using a 1-million-watt AM transmitter; Veteran Australian missionary Graham Stuart Staines and his two sons are burned alive by Hindu extremists as they are sleeping in a car in eastern India.

2000 to present

 2000 – Asia College of Ministry (ACOM), a ministry of Asia Evangelistic Fellowship (AEF), was launched by Jonathan James, to train national missionaries in Asia.
 2001 – New Tribes Missionaries Martin and Gracia Burnham are kidnapped in the Philippines by Muslim terrorist group; Baptist missionary Roni Bowers and her infant daughter are killed when a Peruvian Air Force jet fires on their small float-plane. Though severely wounded in both legs, missionary pilot Kevin Donaldson landed the burning plane on the Amazon River.
 2003 – Publication of Back To Jerusalem: Called to Complete the Great Commission – Three Chinese Church Leaders with Paul Hattaway brings Chinese and Korean mission movement to forefront; Coptic priest Fr. Zakaria Botros begins his television and internet mission to Muslims in North Africa, the Middle East, Central Asia, and western countries, resulting in thousands of conversions.
 2004 – Four Southern Baptist missionaries are killed by gunman in Iraq
 2005 – Korean Catholic Bible completed, the first translation of the entire Bible into modern Korean language.
 2006 – Abdul Rahman, an Afghan Christian convert, is forced out of Afghanistan by local Muslim leaders and exiled to Italy. Missionary Vijay Kumar is publicly stoned by Hindu extremists for Christian preaching.
 2007 – Kriol Bible completed, the first translation of the entire Bible into an Australian indigenous language
 2010 – The Third Lausanne Congress on World Evangelization held in Cape Town, South Africa
 2012 – A study by political scientist Robert Woodberry, focusing on Protestant missionaries, found that they have often left a very positive societal impact in the areas where they worked. "In cross-national statistical analysis Protestant missions are significantly and robustly associated with higher levels of printing, education, economic development, organizational civil society, protection of private property, and rule of law and with lower levels of corruption".
2016 – MECO UK and Ireland merge with SIM.
2019 – Vatican holds synod on the evangelization of the Amazon.

See also
 Missionary
Christianity and colonialism
Evangelism
Indigenous church mission theory
Missiology
Mission (Christianity)
Catholic missions
 List of Christian Missionaries
Missionary kid
Missionary religious institutes and societies
Proselytism
Religious conversion

References

Sources
Anderson, Gerald H.,(ed.) Biographical dictionary of Christian missions, Simon & Schuster Macmillan, 1998; includes 2400 missionaries; excerpt
Bainbridge, William F.  Around the World Tour of Christian Missions: A Universal Survey (1882) 583 pages;  full text online
Barrett, David, ed. World Christian Encyclopedia, Oxford University Press, 1982
 Bliss, Edwin Munsell, ed. The Encyclopaedia of missions. Descriptive, historical, biographical, statistical. With a full assortment of maps, a complete bibliography, and lists of Bible version, missionary societies, mission stations, and a general index online vol 1 1891, 724pp; online vol 2 1891, 726pp
 Copplestone, J. Tremayne. History of Methodist Missions, vol. 4: Twentieth-Century Perspectives (1973), 1288 pp; comprehensive world coverage for Methodists -- online
 Cox, Jeffrey. The British Missionary Enterprise since 1700 (2008).
Etherington, Norman, ed. Missions and Empire (Oxford History of the British Empire Companion Series) (2008)
Gailey, Charles R. and Howard Culbertson. Discovering Missions, Beacon Hill Press of Kansas City, 2007
Glazier, Michael and Monika K. Hellwig, eds., The Modern Catholic Encyclopedia, Liturgical Press, 2004
Glover, Robert H. The Progress of World-Wide Missions, rev. by J. Herbert Kane., Harper and Row, 1960
Herbermann, Charles George. The Catholic Encyclopedia, The Encycylopedia Press, 1913
Herzog, Johann Jakob, Philip Schaff, and Albert Hauck. The New Schaff-Herzog Encyclopedia of Religious Knowledge, 12 volumes, Funk and Wagnalls Company, 1910–11
Kane, J. Herbert. A Concise History of the Christian World Mission, Baker, 1982
 excerpt and text search and highly detailed table of contents
Laroutette, Kenneth Scott. A History of Christianity, 2 vol 1975
Latourette, Kenneth Scott. A History of the Expansion of Christianity, 7 volumes, (1938–45), the most detailed scholarly history online in 7 volumes
 Mason, Alfred DeWitt. Outlines of missionary history (1912) online  362pp
Moreau, A. Scott, David Burnett, Charles Edward van Engen and Harold A. Netland. Evangelical Dictionary of World Missions, Baker Book House Company, 2000
Neill, Stephen. A History of Christian Missions. Penguin Books, 1986; Comprehensive survey
Newcomb, Harvey. A Cyclopedia of Missions: Containing a Comprehensive View of Missionary Operations Throughout the World : with Geographical Descriptions, and Accounts of the Social, Moral, and Religious Condition of the People (1860) 792 pages  complete text online
Olson, C. Gordon. What in the World is God Doing? Global Gospel Publishers, 2003
Parker, J. Fred. Mission to the World. Nazarene Publishing House, 1988
Pocock, Michael, Gailyn Van Rheenen, Douglas McConnell. The Changing Face of World Missions: Engaging Contemporary Issues And Trends (2005); 391 pages
 Robinson, Charles H. History of Christian missions (1915), Comprehensive coverage; online
 Shedd, Clarence Prouty. Two centuries of student Christian movements: Their origin and intercollegiate life (1934) online.
 Tejirian, Eleanor H.,  and Reeva Spector Simon, eds. Conflict, Conquest, and Conversion: Two Thousand Years of Christian Missions in the Middle East (Columbia University Press; 2012) 280 pages;  focus on the 19th and 20th centuries.
 Tiedemann, R.G. Reference Guide to Christian Missionary Societies in China: From the Sixteenth to the Twentieth Century (2009).

 Udy, James Stuart. A "Attitudes within the Protestant churches of the Occident towards the propagation of Christianity in the Orient: an historical survey to 1914" (PhD. Dissertation. Boston University, 1952) online; major scholarly history
Walker, Williston. A History of the Christian Church. 1959
 Young, Richard Fox, ed.  'Studies in the History of Christian Missions: Essays in Honor of Robert Eric Frykenberg'' (2009) Online, 14 scholarly essays on India.

External links
 Complete text of 200+ missionary histories pre-1923

Christian missions
Christian missions